= Lockheed F-104 Starfighter =

1956 fighter aircraft family by Lockheed

F-104 Starfighter
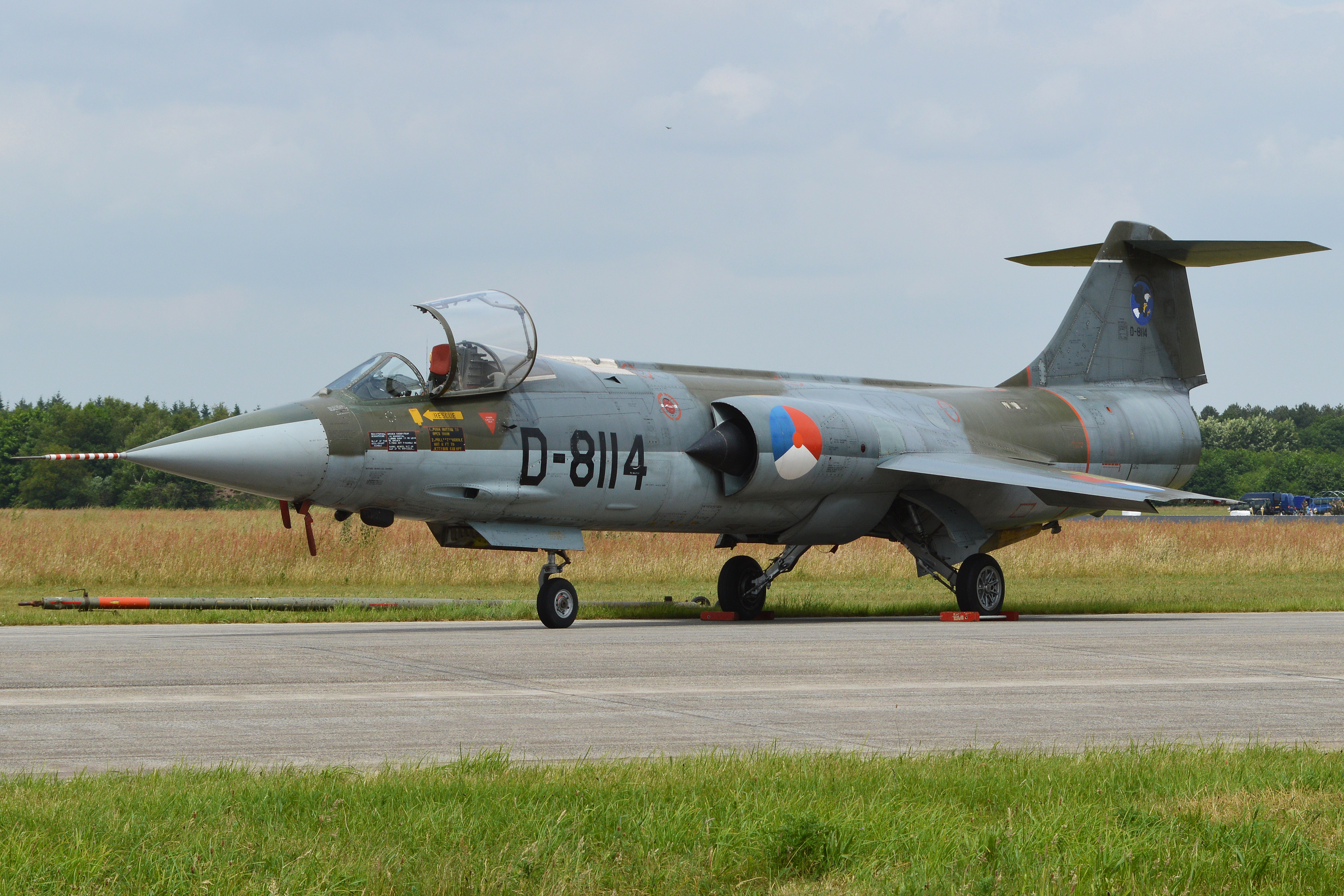
- A former Royal Netherlands Air Force F-104G

General information
- Type: Interceptor aircraft; Fighter-bomber
- National origin: United States
- Manufacturer: Lockheed
- Status: Retired from military service; in use with civilian operators as warbirds
- Primary users: United States Air Force: German Air Force; Turkish Air Force; Italian Air Force
- Number built: 2,578

History
- Introduction date: 20 February 1958 (United States)
- First flight: 4 March 1954 (XF-104)
- Retired: 1969 (USAF); 1975 (US ANG); 1972 (Pakistani Air Force); 1997 (Taiwanese Air Force); 31 October 2004 (Italian Air Force)
- Developed from: Lockheed XF-104 Starfighter
- Variants: Lockheed NF-104A; Canadair CF-104 Starfighter; Aeritalia F-104S Starfighter
- Developed into: Lockheed CL-1200 Lancer/X-27; Lockheed CL-288

The Lockheed F-104 Starfighter is an American single-engine, supersonic interceptor. Created as a day fighter by Lockheed as one of the "Century Series" of fighter aircraft for the United States Air Force (USAF), it was developed into an all-weather multirole aircraft in the early 1960s and extensively deployed as a fighter-bomber during the Cold War. It was also produced under license by other nations and saw widespread service outside the United States.

After interviews with Korean War fighter pilots in 1951, Lockheed lead designer Kelly Johnson chose to buck the trend of ever-larger and more complex fighters to produce a simple, lightweight aircraft with maximum altitude and climb performance. On 4 March 1954, the Lockheed XF-104 took to the skies for the first time, and on 26 February 1958, the production fighter entered service with the USAF. Just a few months later, it was pressed into action during the Second Taiwan Strait Crisis to deter the use of Chinese MiG-15 and MiG-17 fighters. Problems with the General Electric J79 engine and a preference for fighters with longer ranges and heavier payloads initially limited its service with the USAF, though it was deployed for the Berlin Crisis of 1961 and widely used during the Vietnam War, when it flew more than 5,000 combat sorties.

Fifteen NATO and allied air forces eventually flew the Starfighter, many for longer than the USAF. In October 1958, West Germany chose the F-104 as its primary fighter aircraft. Canada soon followed, then the Netherlands, Belgium, Japan, and Italy. The European nations formed a construction consortium that was the largest international manufacturing program in history to that point. In 1975, it was revealed that Lockheed had bribed many foreign military and political figures to secure purchase contracts.

The Starfighter had a poor safety record, especially in Luftwaffe service. The Germans lost 292 of 916 aircraft and 116 pilots from 1961 to 1989, leading the German public to dub it Witwenmacher ("widowmaker"). The final production version, the F-104S, was an all-weather interceptor built by Aeritalia for the Italian Air Force. It was retired from military service in 2004. As of 2026, several F-104s remain in civilian operation with Florida-based Starfighters Space.

The Starfighter's design was radical, with thin, stubby wings attached farther back on the fuselage than most contemporary aircraft. The wing provided excellent supersonic and high-speed, low-altitude performance, but also poor turning capability and high landing speeds. It was the first production aircraft to achieve Mach 2, and the first aircraft to reach an altitude of 100,000 ft (30,000 m) after taking off under its own power. The Starfighter established world records for airspeed, altitude, and time-to-climb in 1958, becoming the first aircraft to hold all three simultaneously. It was also the first aircraft to be equipped with the M61 Vulcan autocannon.

== Development ==
=== Background and early development ===
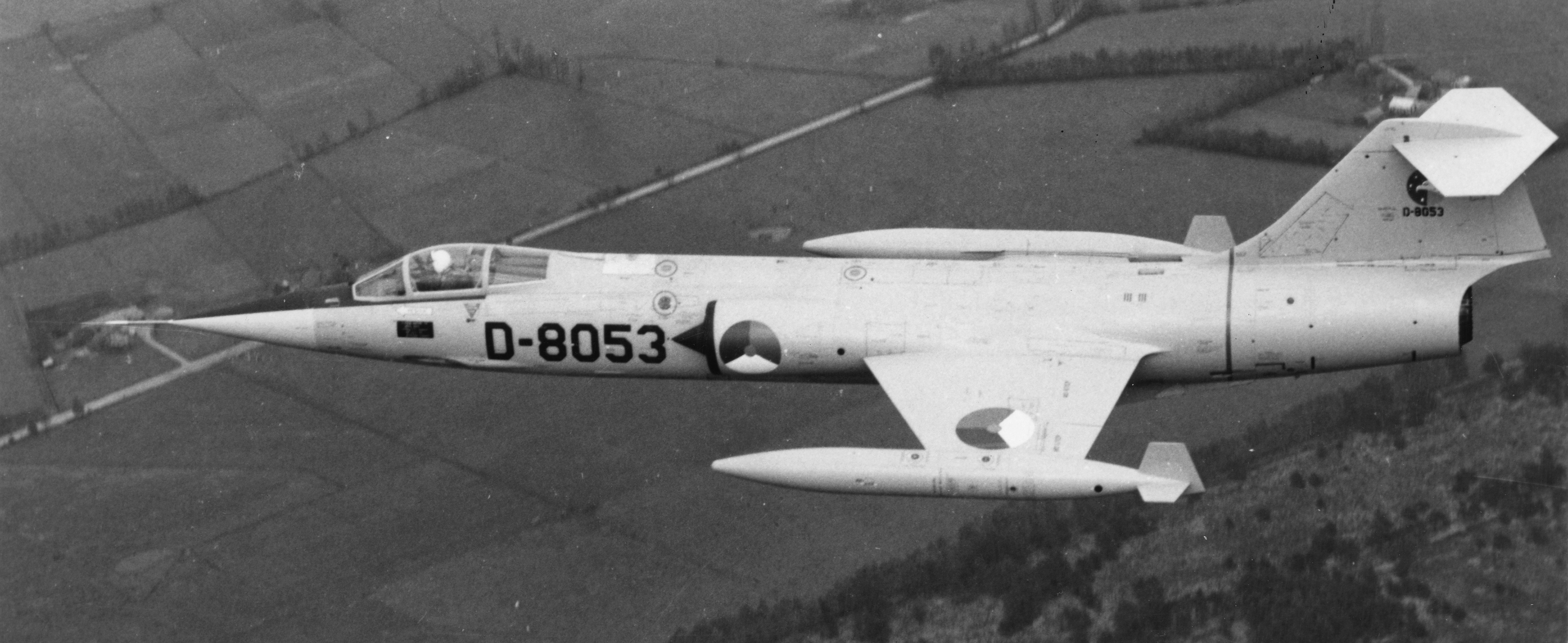
A Royal Netherlands Air Force F-104G Starfighter in flight on 2 June 1963.

Clarence L. "Kelly" Johnson, vice president of engineering and research at Lockheed's Skunk Works, visited USAF air bases across South Korea in November 1951 to speak with fighter pilots about what they wanted and needed in a fighter aircraft. At the time, the American pilots were confronting the MiG-15 with North American F-86 Sabres, and many felt that the MiGs were superior to the larger and more complex American fighters. The pilots requested a small and simple aircraft with excellent performance, especially high-speed and high-altitude capabilities. Johnson started the design of such an aircraft upon his return to the United States. In March 1952, his team was assembled; they studied over 100 aircraft configurations, ranging from small designs at just 8,000 lb (3,600 kg), to large ones up to 50,000 lb (23,000 kg). To achieve the desired performance, Lockheed chose a small and simple aircraft, weighing in at 12,000 lb (5,400 kg) with a single powerful engine. The engine chosen was the new General Electric J79 turbojet, an engine of dramatically improved performance in comparison with contemporary designs. The small design powered by a single J79, issued Temporary Design Number L-246, remained essentially identical to the prototype Starfighter as eventually delivered. Lockheed designated the prototype Model 083.

Johnson presented his new fighter concept to the United States Air Force on 5 November 1952, and they were interested enough to create a general operational requirement for a lightweight fighter to supplement and ultimately replace the yet-to-fly North American F-100. Three additional companies were named finalists for the requirement: Republic Aviation with the AP-55, an improved version of its prototype XF-91 Thunderceptor; North American Aviation with the NA-212, which eventually evolved into the F-107; and Northrop Corporation with the N-102 Fang, another J79-powered entry. Although all three finalists' proposals were strong, Lockheed had what proved to be an insurmountable head start, and was granted a development contract on 12 March 1953 for two prototypes; these were given the designation "XF-104".

Work progressed quickly, with a mock-up ready for inspection at the end of April, and work starting on two prototypes soon after. Meanwhile, the J79 engine was not ready. Both prototypes were instead built to use the Wright J65 engine, a license-constructed version of the Armstrong Siddeley Sapphire. The first prototype was completed at Lockheed's Burbank facility by early 1954 and first flew on 4 March at Edwards AFB. The total time from contract to first flight was less than one year.

Though development of the F-104 was never a secret, only a vague description of the aircraft was given when the USAF first revealed its existence. No photographs of the aircraft were released to the public until 1956, even though the XF-104 first flew in 1954. At the April 1956 public unveiling of the YF-104A, the engine inlets were obscured with metal covers. Visible weapons, including the M61 Vulcan cannon, were also hidden. Despite the secrecy, an artist's rendering of the yet-unseen F-104 appeared in the September 1954 edition of Popular Mechanics that was very close to the actual design.

The prototype made a hop into the air during taxi trials on 28 February 1954 and flew about five feet (1.5 m) off the ground for a short distance, but this was not counted as a first flight. On 4 March, Lockheed test pilot Tony LeVier flew the XF-104 for its first official flight. He was airborne for only 21 minutes, much shorter than planned, due to landing gear retraction problems. The second prototype was destroyed several weeks later during gun-firing trials when the hatch to the ejector seat blew out, depressurizing the cockpit and causing the pilot to eject in the mistaken belief that a cannon mishap had crippled the aircraft. Nevertheless, on 1 November 1955 the remaining XF-104 was accepted by the USAF.

=== Further development ===
Based on the testing and evaluation of the XF-104, the next variant, the YF-104A, was lengthened and fitted with a General Electric J79 engine, modified landing gear, and modified air intakes. The YF-104A and subsequent models were 5 ft 6 in (1.68 m) longer than the XF-104 to accommodate the larger GE J79 engine. The YF-104 initially flew with the GE XJ79-GE-3 turbojet which generated 9,300 pounds of dry thrust (14,800 with afterburner), which was later replaced by the J79-GE-3A with an improved afterburner.

Seventeen YF-104As were ordered by the USAF on 30 March 1955 for further flight testing. The first of them flew on 17 February 1956 and, with the other 16 trial aircraft, was soon carrying out aircraft and equipment evaluation and tests. On 1 May 1957 one of the prototypes was destroyed when the ailerons malfunctioned, resulting in the aircraft tumbling wildly. The pilot ejected safely. Lockheed made several improvements to the YF-104A throughout this testing period, including strengthening the airframe, adding a ventral fin to improve directional stability at supersonic speed, and installing a boundary layer control system (BLCS) to reduce landing speed.

Problems were encountered with the J79 afterburner; further delays were caused by the need to add AIM-9 Sidewinder air-to-air missiles. On 28 January 1958, the first production F-104A to enter service was delivered to the 83rd Fighter Interceptor Wing.

=== Redesign for NATO ===
In response to a 1957 German Air Staff Paper asking for a single aircraft to fulfill its fighter, fighter-bomber, and reconnaissance mission requirements, Lockheed redesigned the entire airframe, including 96 new forgings, additional skin panels, and reinforced landing gear with larger tires and improved brakes. The proposed F-104G (for Germany) "Super Starfighter" featured a more powerful J79-11A engine, a larger tail with powered rudder (the same used on the two-seat F-104B and D), improved blown flaps with a mode for improved maneuverability, electric de-icing equipment for the air intake inlets, and a larger drogue chute. Avionics were improved as well, primarily with the Autonetics F15A NASARR (North American Search and Range Radar) multi-mode radar and the LN-3 inertial navigation system by Litton Industries, the first such system to be placed into operational service. Altogether, these changes increased the amount of external weapons that could be carried to 3,000 lb (1,400 kg), and also allowed the aircraft to fulfill the NATO requirement of carrying a 2,000 lb (910 kg) "special store" (nuclear weapon) under the fuselage.

Belgium, the Netherlands, and Italy selected the F-104 soon after as well, and the four European nations set up four production groups to jointly manufacture the F-104G under license. Arbeitsgemeinschaft (ARGE) South consisted of Messerschmitt, Heinkel, Dornier, and Siebel; ARGE North comprised Hamburger Flugzeugbau, Focke-Wulf, and Weserflug in Germany, as well as Fokker and Aviolanda in the Netherlands; the West Group was made of SABCA and Avions Fairey in Belgium; and the Italian Group was formed of Fiat, Macchi, Piaggio, SACA, and SIAI-Marchetti. The four groups were contracted to manufacture 210, 350, 189, and 200 F-104G aircraft, respectively. In addition, 1,225 J79 turbojets were also produced under license by BMW in Germany, Fabrique Nationale in Belgium, and Alfa Romeo in Italy. Canada, who had also chosen the Starfighter to fulfill its NATO obligations, delivered 121 sets of wings, aft fuselages, and tail assemblies built by Canadair to Europe while it constructed 200 CF-104s with Orenda-built engines for the Royal Canadian Air Force. Later the two would also build an additional 110 MAP-funded F-104Gs destined for Europe. Lockheed for its part built 191 two-seat trainers for both Europe and Canada, as well as supplying spares and technical support.

The multinational consortium formed a central coordination office named NASMO (NATO Starfighter Management Office) in Koblenz, Germany, which succeeded in achieving a high level of standardization and cooperation. This was evidenced by an F-104G being assembled in April 1963 at Erding Air Base in Germany consisting of components constructed in all four European partner countries. However, this central coordination resulted in long delays in implementing needed modifications and upgrades. Some of the modifications that were proposed during this time, mainly from the Joint Test Force at Edwards AFB in California, were the installation of an arrester hook, a standby attitude indicator, and the emergency engine nozzle closure system.

In all, 2,578 F-104s were produced by Lockheed and under license by various foreign manufacturers.

== Design ==
=== Airframe ===
The Starfighter's airframe was all-metal, primarily duralumin with some stainless steel and titanium. The fuselage was approximately two and a half times as long as the airplane's wingspan. The wings were centered on the horizontal reference plane, or along the longitudinal centerline of the fuselage, and were located substantially farther aft on the fuselage than most contemporary designs. The aft fuselage was elevated from the horizontal reference plane, resulting a "lifted" tail, and the nose was "drooped". This caused the aircraft to fly nose up, helping to minimize drag. As a result, the pitot tube, air inlet scoops, and engine thrust line were all canted slightly from centerline of the fuselage.

The F-104 featured a radical wing design. Most jet fighters of the period used a swept-wing or delta-wing, which balanced aerodynamic performance, lift, and internal space for fuel and equipment. The Lockheed tests determined that the most efficient shape for high-speed supersonic flight was a very small and thin, straight, mid-mounted, trapezoidal wing. Much of the data on the wing shape was derived from testing done with the experimental unmanned Lockheed X-7, which used a wing of a similar shape. The leading edge of the wing was swept back at 26 degrees, with the trailing edge swept forward by a slightly smaller amount.

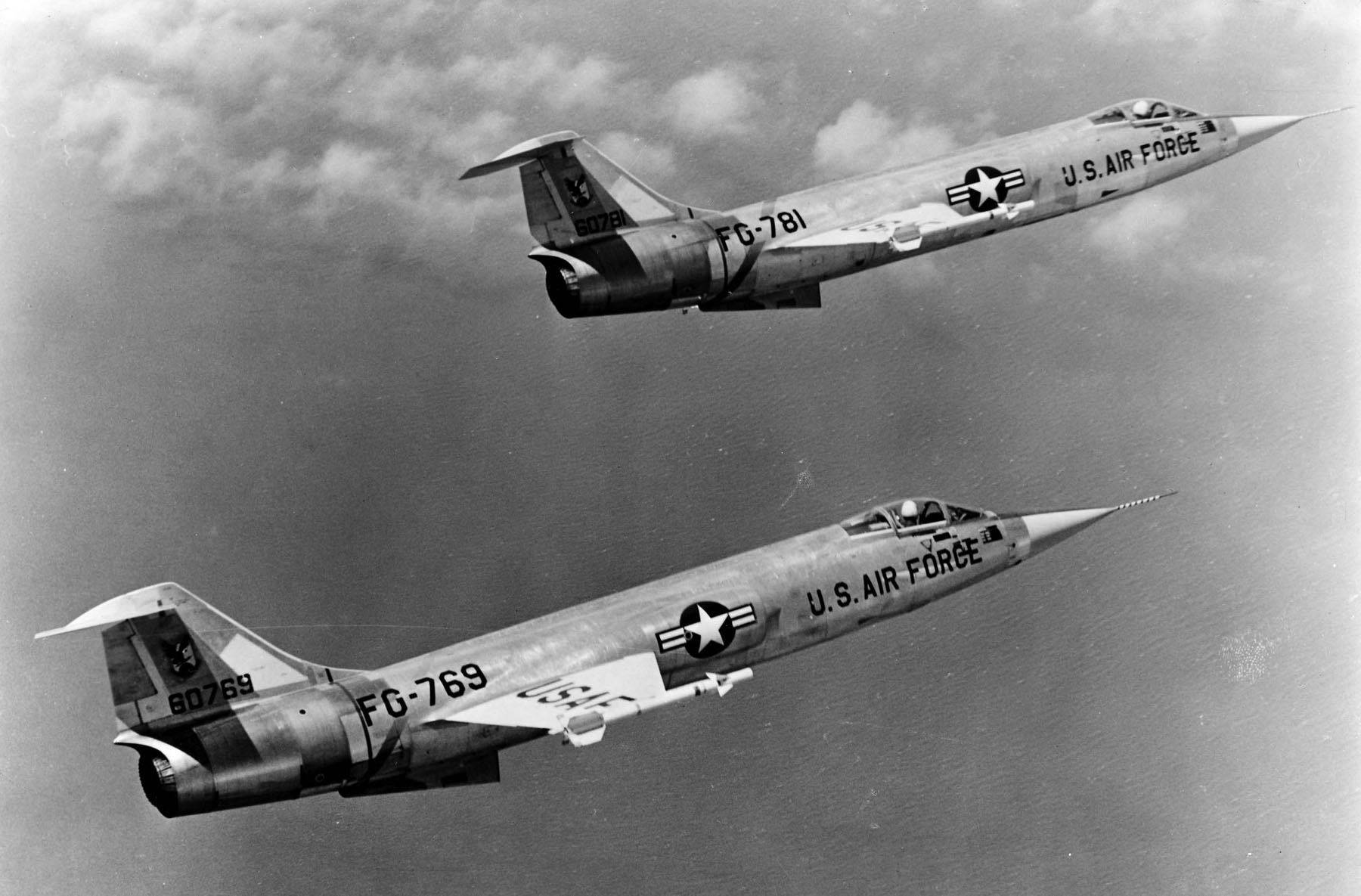
Lockheed F-104A

The new wing design was extremely thin, with a thickness-to-chord ratio of only 3.36% and an aspect ratio of 2.45. The wing's leading edges were so thin (.016 in; 0.41 mm) that they were a hazard to ground crews. Hence, protective guards were installed on them during maintenance. The thinness of the wings required fuel tanks and landing gear to be placed in the fuselage, and the hydraulic cylinders driving the ailerons were limited to 1-inch (25 mm) thickness to fit.

The small, highly loaded wing caused an unacceptably high landing speed, even after adding both leading- and trailing-edge flaps. Thus, designers developed a boundary layer control system, or BLCS, of high-pressure bleed air, which was blown over the trailing-edge flaps to lower landing speeds by more than 30 knots (56 km/h; 35 mph), and help make landing safer. Flapless landings would be without the BLCS engaged, as flaps in the "land" position were required for its operation. Landing without the BLCS engaged was only done in emergencies and could be a harrowing experience, especially at night.

The stabilator (fully moving horizontal stabilizer) was mounted atop the fin to reduce inertia coupling. Because the vertical fin was only slightly shorter than the length of each wing and nearly as aerodynamically effective, it could act as a wing upon rudder application, rolling the aircraft in the opposite direction of rudder input. To offset this effect, the wings were canted downward at a 10° negative-dihedral (anhedral) angle. This downward canting also improved roll control during high-G maneuvers, common in air-to-air combat.

The fuselage had a high fineness ratio. It was slender, tapered towards the sharp nose, and had a small frontal area. The tightly packed fuselage contained the radar, cockpit, cannon, fuel, landing gear, and engine. The fuselage and wing combination provided low drag except at high angle of attack (alpha), at which point induced drag became very high. The F-104 had good acceleration, rate of climb, and top speed, but its sustained turn performance was poor. A "clean" (no external weapons or fuel tanks) F-104 could sustain a 7-g turn below 5,000 feet with full afterburner. Given the aircraft's prodigious fuel consumption at that altitude and relatively small fuel capacity, such a maneuver would dramatically reduce its time on station.

=== Engine ===
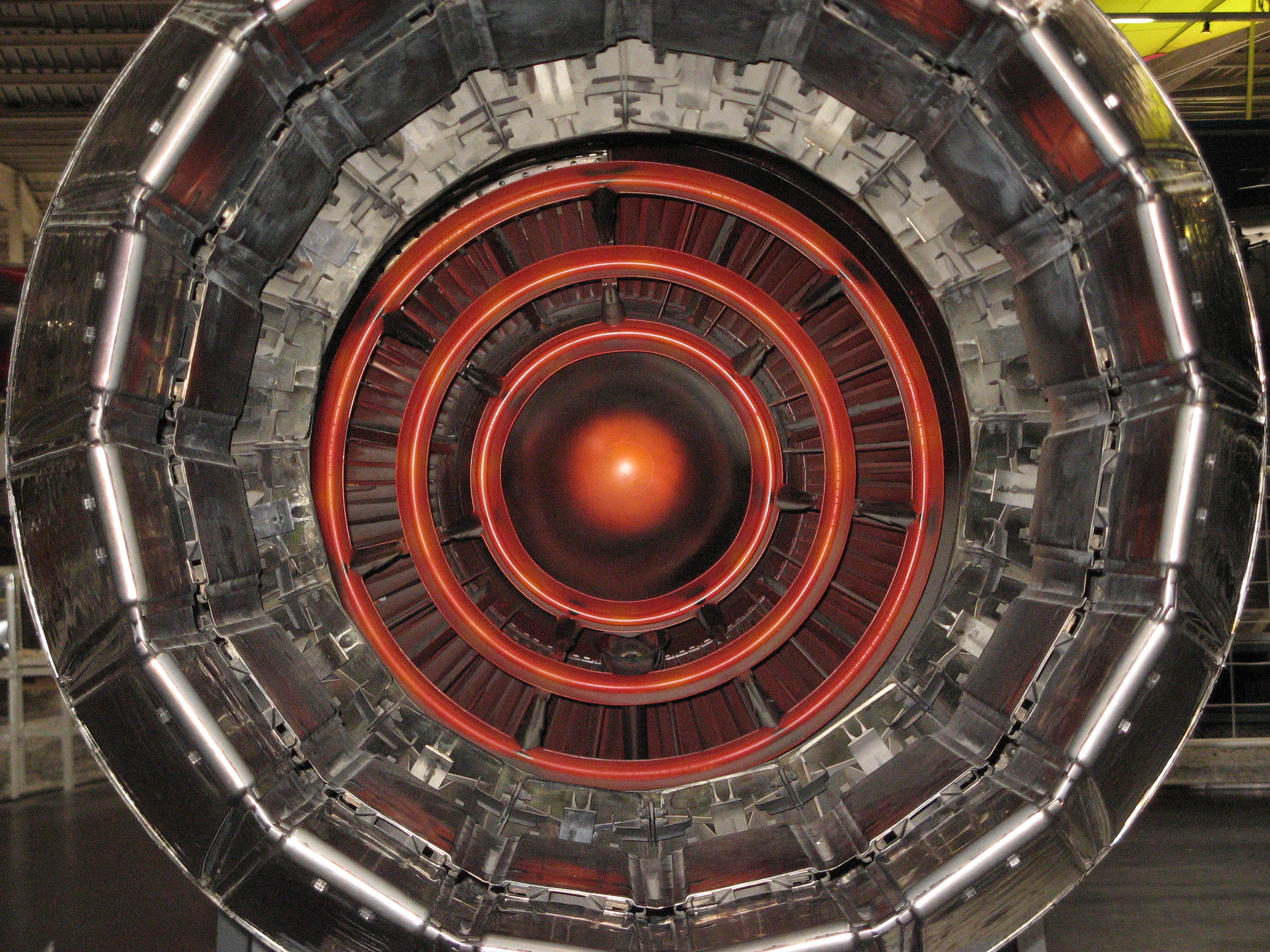
Detail of F-104G's GE J79 turbojet exhaust (red coloring added by Technik Museum Sinsheim, Germany)

The F-104 was designed to use the General Electric J79 turbojet engine, fed by side-mounted intakes with fixed inlet cones optimized for performance at Mach 1.7 (increased to Mach 2 for later F-104s equipped with more powerful J79-GE-19 engines). Unlike some supersonic aircraft, the F-104 did not have variable-geometry inlets; instead at high Mach numbers excess air was bypassed around the engine. This bypass air also helped cool the engine. Its thrust-to-drag ratio was excellent, allowing a maximum speed well in excess of Mach 2. Available thrust was actually limited by the geometry of the inlet scoop and duct; the aircraft was capable of even higher Mach numbers if the aluminum skin of the aircraft were able to withstand the heating due to air friction. Furthermore, speeds above Mach 2 quickly overheated the J79 engine beyond its thermal capabilities, which resulted in the F-104 being given a design airspeed limitation of Mach 2.

The engine consisted of a 17-stage compressor, an accessory drive section, an annular combustion chamber, a three-stage turbine, and an afterburner. The most powerful version of the J79, the J79-GE-19, was rated at 52.8 kN (11,900 lb_{f}) dry thrust and 79.6 kN (17,900 lb_{f}) with afterburner. Bleed air from the compressor's 17th stage was used for a number of purposes: the BLCS, cabin pressurization and air conditioning, hot-air jet rain removal, fuel transfer, canopy and windshield defogging and defrosting, pressure for the pilot's anti-G suit, pressurization and cooling of the nose-mounted radar equipment, and purging of gas from the M61 autocannon. The accessory drive ran two hydraulic pumps, two variable-frequency generators, the generator for the tachometer, and pumps for engine fuel and oil.

=== Armament ===
The basic armament of the F-104 was the 20 mm (0.79 in) M61 Vulcan autocannon. As the first aircraft to carry the weapon, testing of the Starfighter revealed issues with the initial version of the M61; the rotary cannon suffered problems with its linked ammunition, being prone to misfeed and presenting a foreign object damage (FOD) hazard as discarded links were occasionally sucked into the engine. A linkless ammunition feed system was developed for the upgraded M61A1 installed in the F-104C; the M61A1 has subsequently been used by a wide variety of American combat aircraft.

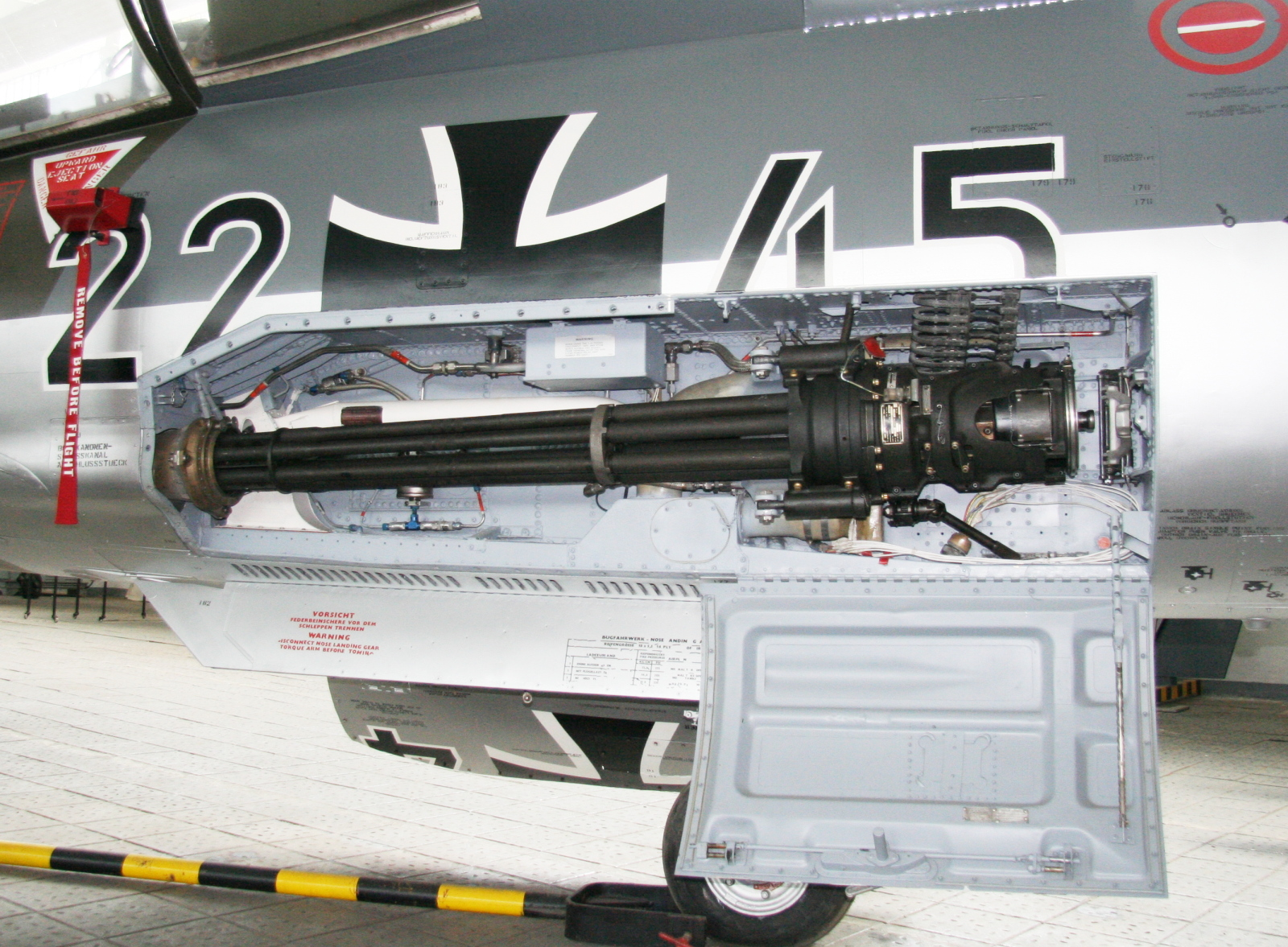
Open weapons bay of a German Air Force F-104G exposing the M61 cannon

The cannon, mounted in the lower part of the port fuselage, was fed by a 725-round drum behind the pilot's seat. With its firing rate of 6,000 rounds per minute, the cannon would empty the drum after just over seven seconds of continuous fire. The cannon was omitted in all the two-seat models and some single-seat versions including reconnaissance aircraft, with the gun bay and ammunition drum typically replaced by additional fuel tanks.

Two AIM-9 Sidewinder air-to-air missiles could be carried on the wingtip stations, which could also be used for fuel tanks. The F-104C and later models added a centerline pylon and two underwing pylons for bombs, rocket pods, or fuel tanks; the centerline pylon could carry a nuclear weapon. A "catamaran" launcher for two additional Sidewinders could be fitted under the forward fuselage, although the installation had minimal ground clearance and so rendered the seeker heads of the missiles vulnerable to ground debris. The two F-104S variants added a pair of fuselage pylons beneath the intakes for conventional bomb carriage and an additional pylon under each wing, for a total of nine.

Early Starfighters were also capable of carrying and launching a single MB-1 (AIR-2A Genie) rocket-powered nuclear missile using an extending trapeze launcher. This configuration was tested on a single aircraft but was not adopted for service use; however, NASA later used it for launching test rockets.

=== Avionics ===
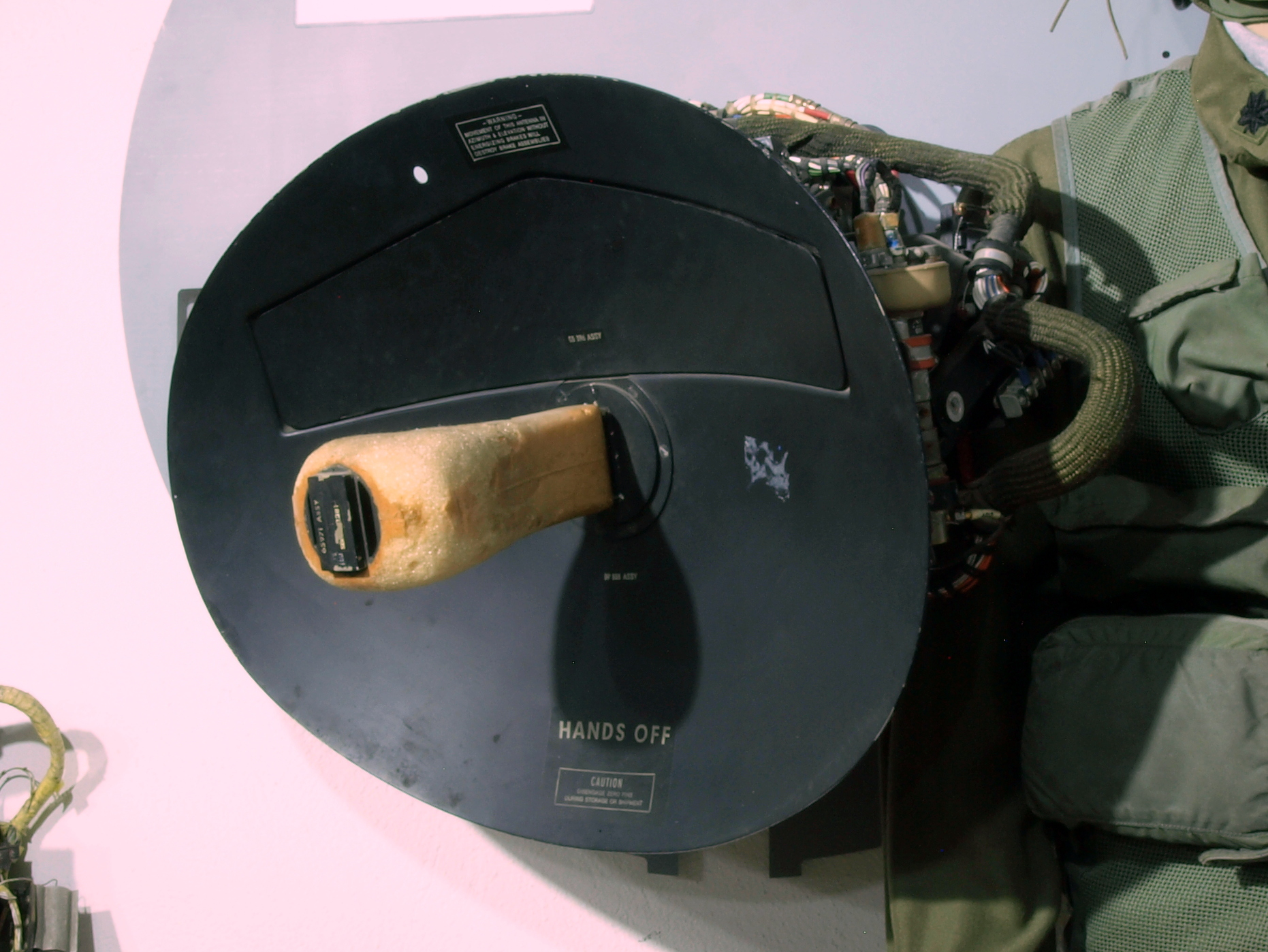
NASARR radar on F-104

The initial USAF Starfighters had a basic RCA AN/ASG-14T1 ranging radar, tactical air navigation system (TACAN), and an AN/ARC-34 UHF radio. The AN/ASG-14 fire control system used a 24-inch (610 mm) pencil-beam radar antenna with two independent sights: one optical and one infrared. Early versions of the radar had a range of approximately 20 miles (32 km) in search mode, with later models reaching up to 40 miles (64 km); the scan pattern was spiral, covering a 90-degree cone. Search mode was usable only above 3,000 feet (910 m) due to ground return effects below that altitude. Track mode was usable within 10 miles (16 km) of the target, which narrowed the scan to 20 degrees and initiated a strobe sweep between 300 and 3,000 yards (270 and 2,740 m) in auto-acquisition mode. The radar also had a third, receive-only mode useful for locking onto sources of interference from electronic countermeasures (ECM).

In the late 1960s, Lockheed developed a more advanced version of the Starfighter, the F-104S, for use by the Italian Air Force. Similarly to the F-104G, Lockheed produced two main variants of the F-104S: an all-weather interceptor (caccia intercettore, CI) and a strike aircraft (caccia bombardiere, CB). The CI variant received a FIAR/NASARR F15G radar with AIM-7 Sparrow guidance capability; however, the new missile-guidance avionics came at the expense of the M61A1 Vulcan cannon, which was removed to make room. The CB variant was equipped with a FIAR/NASARR R21G-H radar and a radar altimeter for low-level strike missions, retaining the cannon as its only air-to-air weapon.

As part of the Aggiornamento Sistema d'Arma (ASA), or "Weapons System Upgrade" in the mid-1980s, both variants were given an ALQ-70/72 ECM and a FIAR/NASARR R-21G/M1 radar with frequency hopping and look-down/shoot-down capability. The new radar and guidance systems enabled the aircraft to carry the new AIM-9L Sidewinder infrared-guided missile (replacing the older AIM-9B) as well as the AIM-7 Sparrow and the Selenia Aspide radar-guided missiles.

=== Ejection seat ===
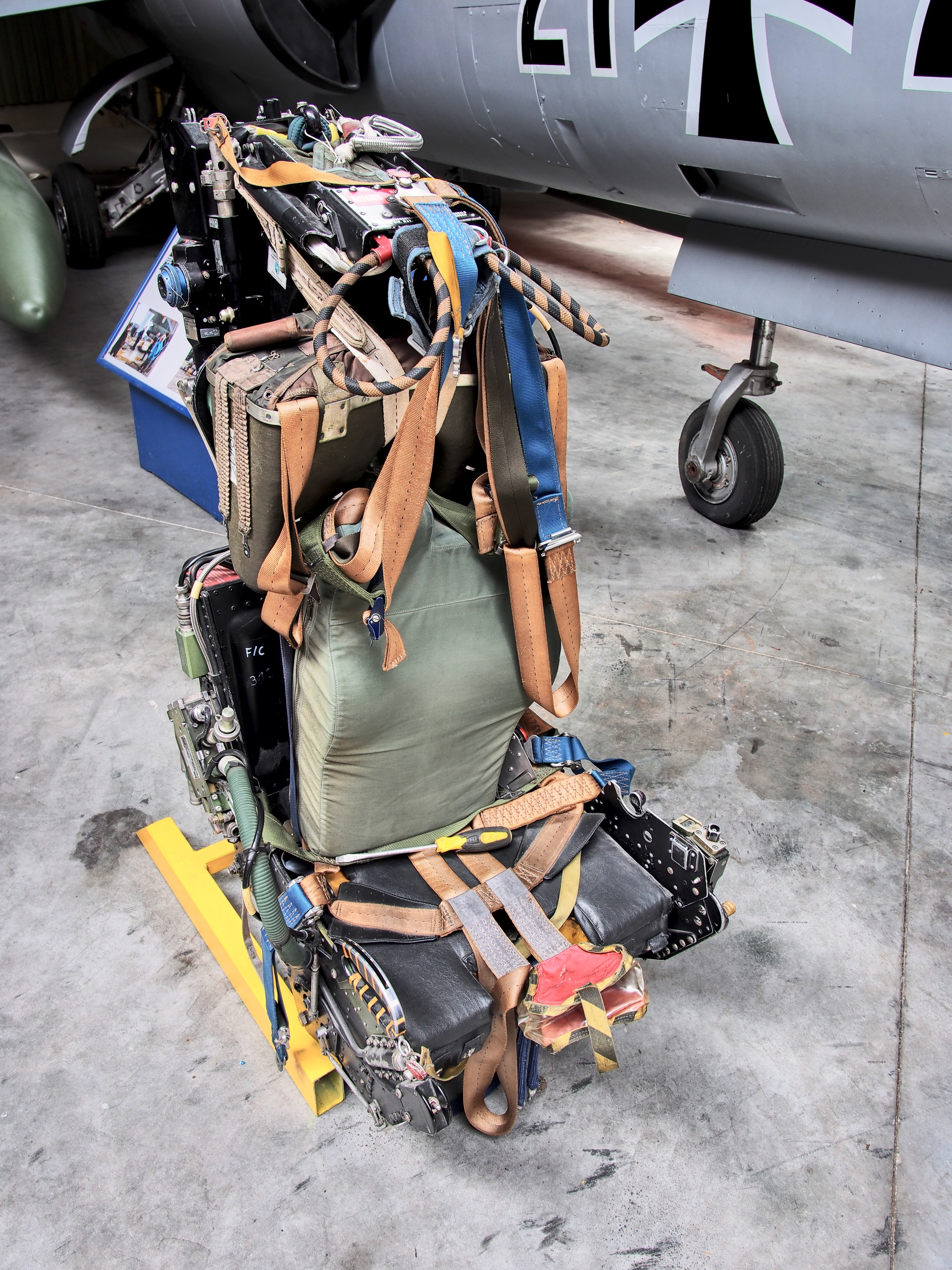
A Martin-Baker Mk.7 ejection seat from an F-104G

Early Starfighters used a downward-firing ejection seat (the Stanley C-1), out of concern over the ability of an upward-firing seat to clear the "T-tail" empennage. This presented obvious problems in low-altitude escapes, and 21 USAF pilots, including test pilot Captain Iven Carl Kincheloe Jr., failed to escape from their stricken aircraft in low-level emergencies because of it. The downward-firing seat was replaced by the Lockheed C-2 upward-firing seat, which was capable of clearing the tail, but still had a minimum speed limitation of 90 kn (104 mph; 167 km/h). Many export Starfighters were later retrofitted with Martin-Baker Mk.7 "zero-zero" (zero altitude and zero airspeed) ejection seats.

=== Production assembly ===
The Starfighter was designed so that a single assembly line could produce up to 20 aircraft per day. The entire aircraft was designed for modular assembly and disassembly. The main fuselage section was assembled in two halves, including wiring and plumbing, that were then joined along the vertical centerline. The wings were then attached with ten bolts plus a fairing.

== Operational history ==
=== U.S. Air Force ===
F-104 test-firing an AIM-9 Sidewinder against a QF-80 target drone

Although the F-104 was designed as an air-superiority fighter, the United States Air Force's immediate need at the time was for a supersonic interceptor. In the late 1950s, the United States government believed it had dangerously fewer jet-powered bombers than the Soviet Union. In response, the USAF had ordered two interceptors from Convair: the F-102 Delta Dagger and the F-106 Delta Dart, but both were experiencing long development delays. The Starfighter's speed and rate of climb intrigued the Air Force, which pressed the F-104A into service as an interim interceptor with the Air Defense Command (ADC), even though its range and armament were ill-suited for the role. On 26 February 1958, the first unit to become operational with the F-104A was the 83rd Fighter Interceptor Squadron (FIS) at Hamilton AFB, California.

The new aircraft experienced problems with the J79 engine and M61 cannon, and after three months of service, the unit was grounded after engine-related accidents. The aircraft were then fitted with the J79-GE-3B engine, and another three ADC units were equipped with the F-104A. But the Air Force's interest in the Starfighter was waning as the service's preference shifted to fighters with longer ranges and heavier ordnance loads. As a result, the USAF reduced their orders of the F-104A from 722 to 170, and the F-104A and F-104B aircraft of the 83rd, 56th and 337th FIS were handed over to the 151st, 157th and 197th FIS of the Air National Guard (ANG) after less than a year of service with the ADC.

==== Taiwan Strait Crisis of 1958 ====
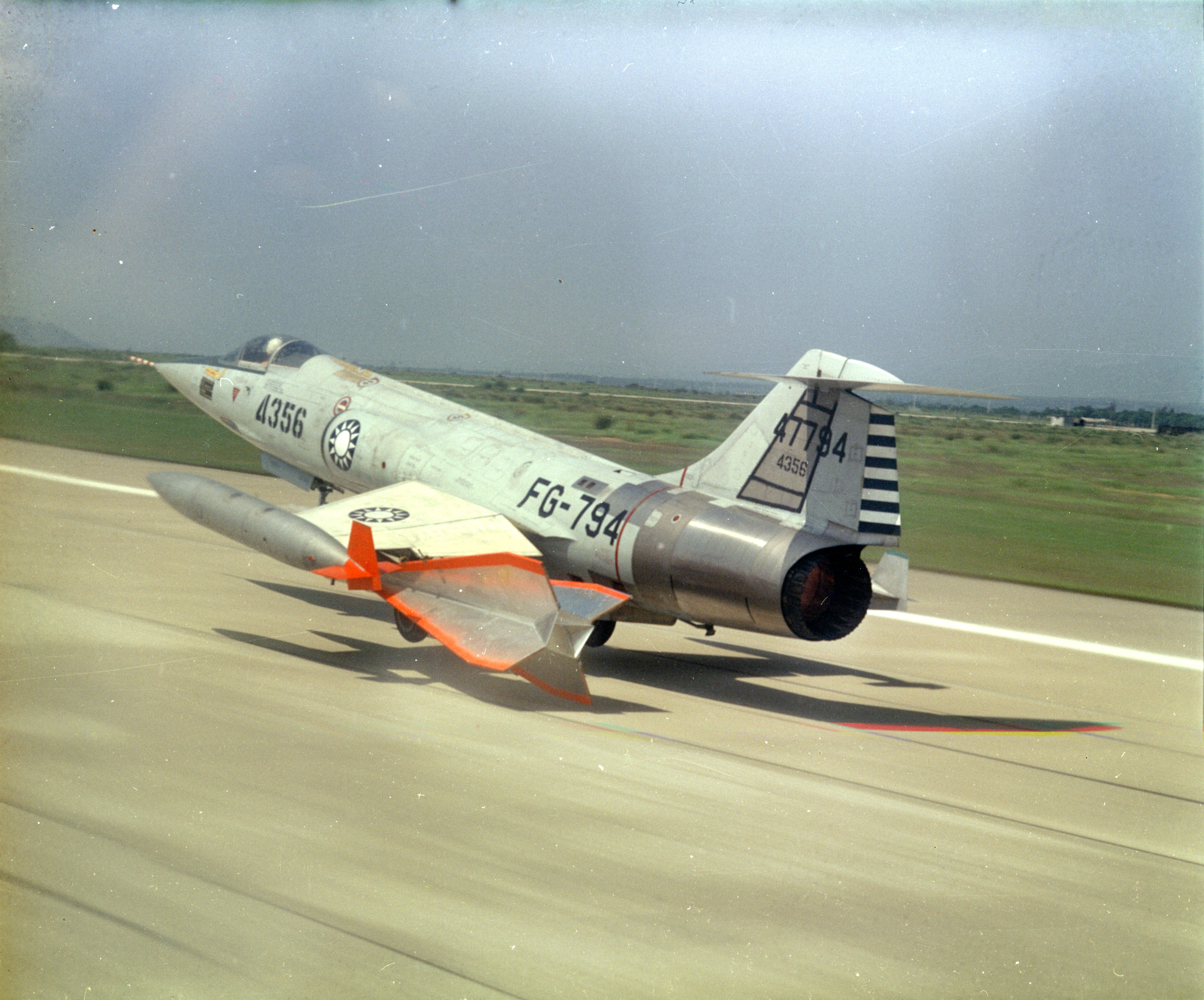
An F-104G target tug of the Republic of China Air Force (ROCAF) taking off from Ching Chaun Kang AB, Taichung, Taiwan, in 1969, with a Dart tow target slung under its wing.

In August 1958, only a few months after establishing operational readiness with the F-104, the 83rd FIS was ordered to deploy for an air defense and deterrence mission in Taiwan. The People's Republic of China had begun an intense artillery campaign against the Republic of China (ROC) on the disputed islands of Quemoy and Matsu. Tension between the two forces was high; artillery duels had continued since the first crisis in 1954, and the People's Liberation Army Air Force (PLAAF) had recently moved 200 MiG-15s and MiG-17s to airfields on the mainland to fight the Republic of China Air Force (ROCAF).

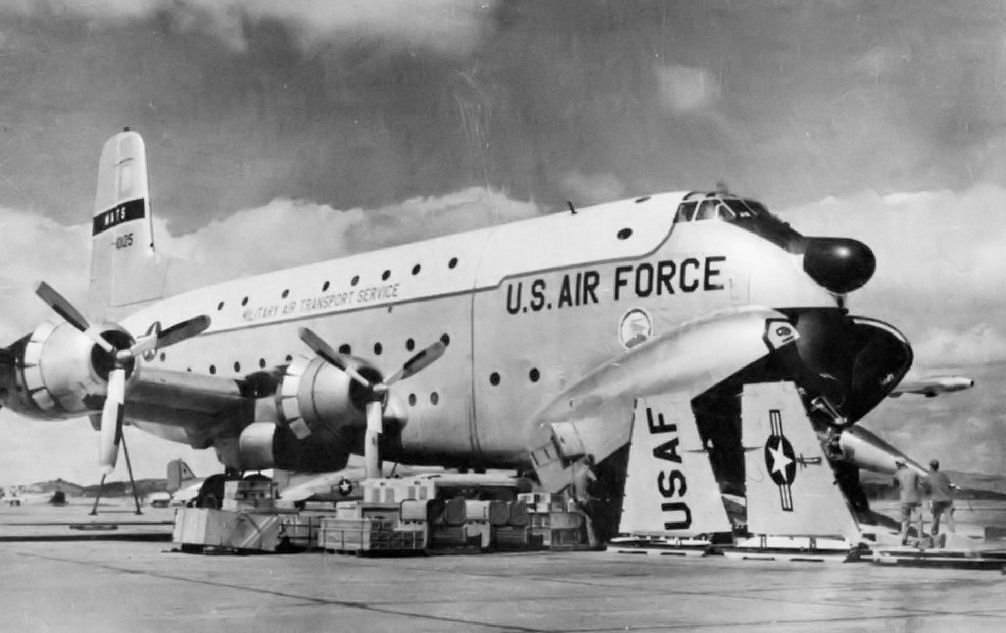
An F-104A being loaded onto a C-124 at Hamilton AFB for transport to Taiwan, 1958

On 10 September, the first F-104s arrived in Taiwan, delivered disassembled by C-124 Globemaster II transport aircraft. This was the first time that air transport was used to move fighter aircraft long distances. Within 30 hours of arriving, First Lieutenant Crosley J. Fitton had the first of the 83rd's airplanes in the air, and by 19 September the entire unit was ready for day or night alert status. The F-104 flew runs between Taiwan and mainland China at speeds up to Mach 2 as an air-superiority demonstration. According to Colonel Howard "Scrappy" Johnson, one of the pilots, the Starfighters were sent so the PLAAF would "track them on their radar screens ...and sit back and scratch their head in awe."

The Starfighters were withdrawn after a ceasefire was agreed on 6 October, and Air Force officials credited the aircraft with deterring attacks. USAF Gen Laurence Kuter, commander-in-chief of the Pacific Air Forces, reported that the F-104A had "made a tremendous impression on both sides of the Taiwan Strait".

==== Berlin Crisis of 1961 ====
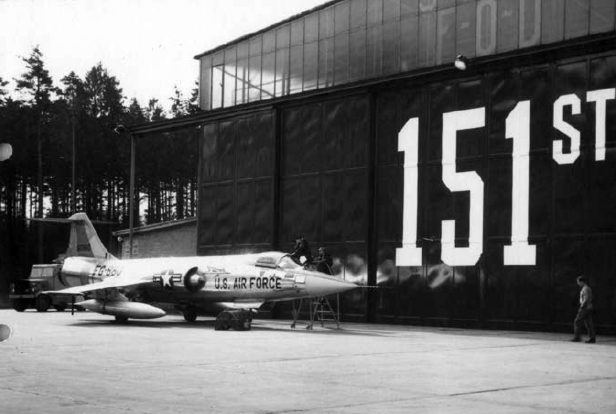
A USAF F-104A of the 151st FIS at Ramstein Air Base, West Germany, in 1961–1962

After the Soviet Union cut off Allied access to Berlin in 1961, President John F. Kennedy ordered 148,000 United States National Guard and reserve personnel to active duty on 30 August. 21,067 people were from the ANG, forming 18 fighter squadrons, four reconnaissance squadrons, six transport squadrons, and a tactical control group. On 1 November 1961, the USAF mobilized three more ANG fighter interceptor squadrons. In late October and early November, eight of the tactical fighter units flew to Europe with their 216 aircraft in Operation Stair Step. Because of their short range, 60 F-104As were airlifted to Europe in late November, including the 151st FIS and 157th FIS. As with the Taiwan crisis three years earlier, the Starfighter did not directly engage any enemy fighters, but its presence provided a powerful air-superiority deterrent; it demonstrated very quick reaction times and exemplary acceleration during practice intercepts, and proved superior to all other fighters in the theater. The crisis ended in the summer of 1962 and the ANG personnel returned to the United States, but the F-104's solid performance helped convince the ADC to recall some F-104s to active USAF service the following year.

==== Vietnam War ====
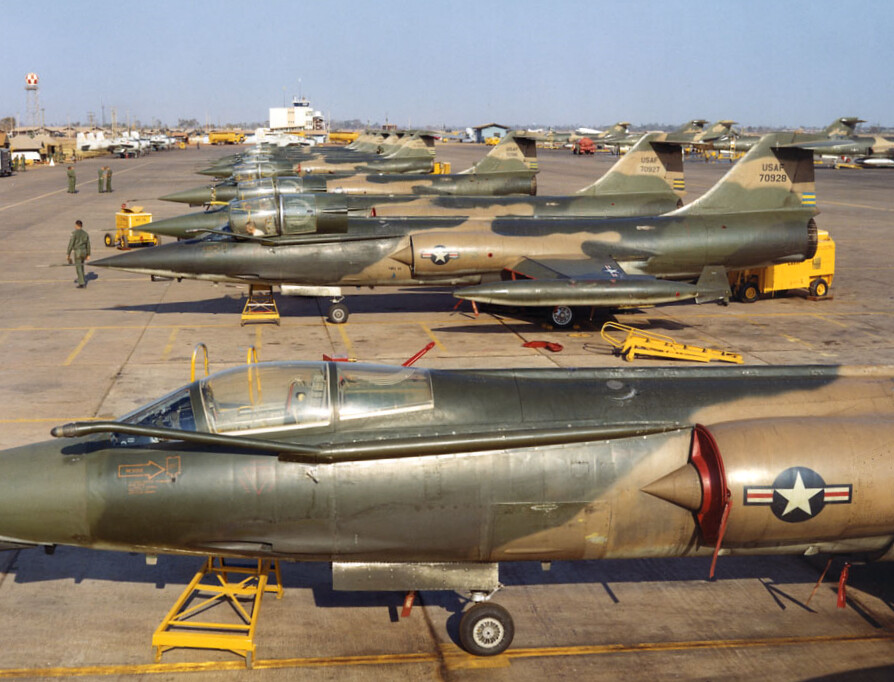
479th TFW F-104Cs at Da Nang, 1965

The Starfighter first saw action in the Vietnam War in 1965, seven years after the F-104C entered service with USAF Tactical Air Command (TAC) as a multi-role fighter and fighter-bomber in 1958; the first TAC unit equipped with the type was the 479th Tactical Fighter Wing (TFW) at George AFB, California.

Starting with Operation Rolling Thunder, the Starfighter was used in air-superiority and air-support roles. On 19 April 1965, the 476th Tactical Fighter Squadron (TFS) of the 479th TFW arrived at Da Nang AB to help protect US F-105 Thunderchief fighter-bombers against MiG-17s and especially MiG-21s that were beginning to be flown by the Vietnamese People's Air Force (VPAF). The F-104 was also deployed extensively as a barrier combat air patrol (BARCAP) protector for the EC-121D Warning Star airborne early warning aircraft patrolling off the North Vietnamese coast. The F-104s deterred MiG interceptors and performed well as close support aircraft. They were largely uninvolved in aerial combat and recorded no air-to-air kills during the conflict. The North Vietnamese were well aware of the F-104's performance, and the 479th TFW's pilots felt that the MiGs deliberately avoided engaging them. Twenty-five MiG kills were scored by fighters controlled by EC-121 Big Eye missions, and their Starfighter escorts played a vital role in ensuring their safety.

From the first F-104 deployment in April 1965 to December, Starfighters flew a total of 2,937 combat sorties. Five were lost: one from the 476th TFS, which deployed from April to July 1965, and four from the 436th Tactical Fighter Squadron, which deployed from July to October 1965. Three were lost on 20 September: after Captain Philip E. Smith's F-104 strayed into Chinese airspace and was shot down by a Chinese Shenyang J-6, two more collided in mid-air while searching for Smith's missing jet. No losses were reported from the 435th Tactical Fighter Squadron's first deployment from October to December 1965.

Starfighters returned to Vietnam when the 435th Tactical Fighter Squadron returned from June 1966 until August 1967. During this time F-104s flew a further 2,269 combat sorties, bringing the wartime total to 5,206. F-104s operating in Vietnam were upgraded in service with AN/APR-25/26 radar warning receiver equipment. One is on display in the Air Zoo in Kalamazoo, Michigan. During the second deployment, nine more aircraft were lost. In all, 14 F-104s were lost to all causes in Vietnam.

In July 1967, the Starfighter units switched to the McDonnell Douglas F-4 Phantom II and their F-104s were sent to the Air National Guard.

USAF F-104s lost during the Vietnam War (1965–1967)
Date	Model	Unit	Cause of loss/remarks
29 Jun 1965	F-104C	476th TFS	Shot down by enemy ground fire while providing close air support (CAS).
22 Jul 1965	F-104C	436th TFS	Downed by ground fire while on a CAS mission.
20 Sep 1965	F-104C	436th TFS	Downed by PLAN Shenyang J-6 (Chinese-built MiG 19) cannon fire while on a MIGCAP mission.
20 Sep 1965	F-104C; F-104C	436th TFS	Mid-air collision while conducting air search for earlier PLAN-downed F-104C.
1 Aug 1966	F-104C	435th TFS	Downed by SA-2 surface-to-air missile (SAM) while on Operation Iron Hand escort mission.
1 Aug 1966	F-104C	435th TFS	Downed by SA-2 SAM while on Iron Hand escort mission.
1 Sep 1966	F-104C	435th TFS	Downed by anti-aircraft artillery fire (AAA) while on armed reconnaissance mission.
2 Oct 1966	F-104C	435th TFS	Downed by SA-2 SAM at 10,000 feet while on armed reconnaissance mission.
20 Oct 1966	F-104C	435th TFS	Downed by ground fire during armed reconnaissance mission.
12 Jan 1967	F-104C	435th TFS	Operational loss; crashed while landing after a CAP mission.
16 Jan 1967	F-104C	435th TFS	Operational loss; engine failure during a CAP mission.
28 Jan 1967	F-104C	435th TFS	Operational loss; engine failure during a CAP mission.
14 May 1967	F-104C	435th TFS	Operational loss; engine failure during armed reconnaissance mission.

==== North American service ====
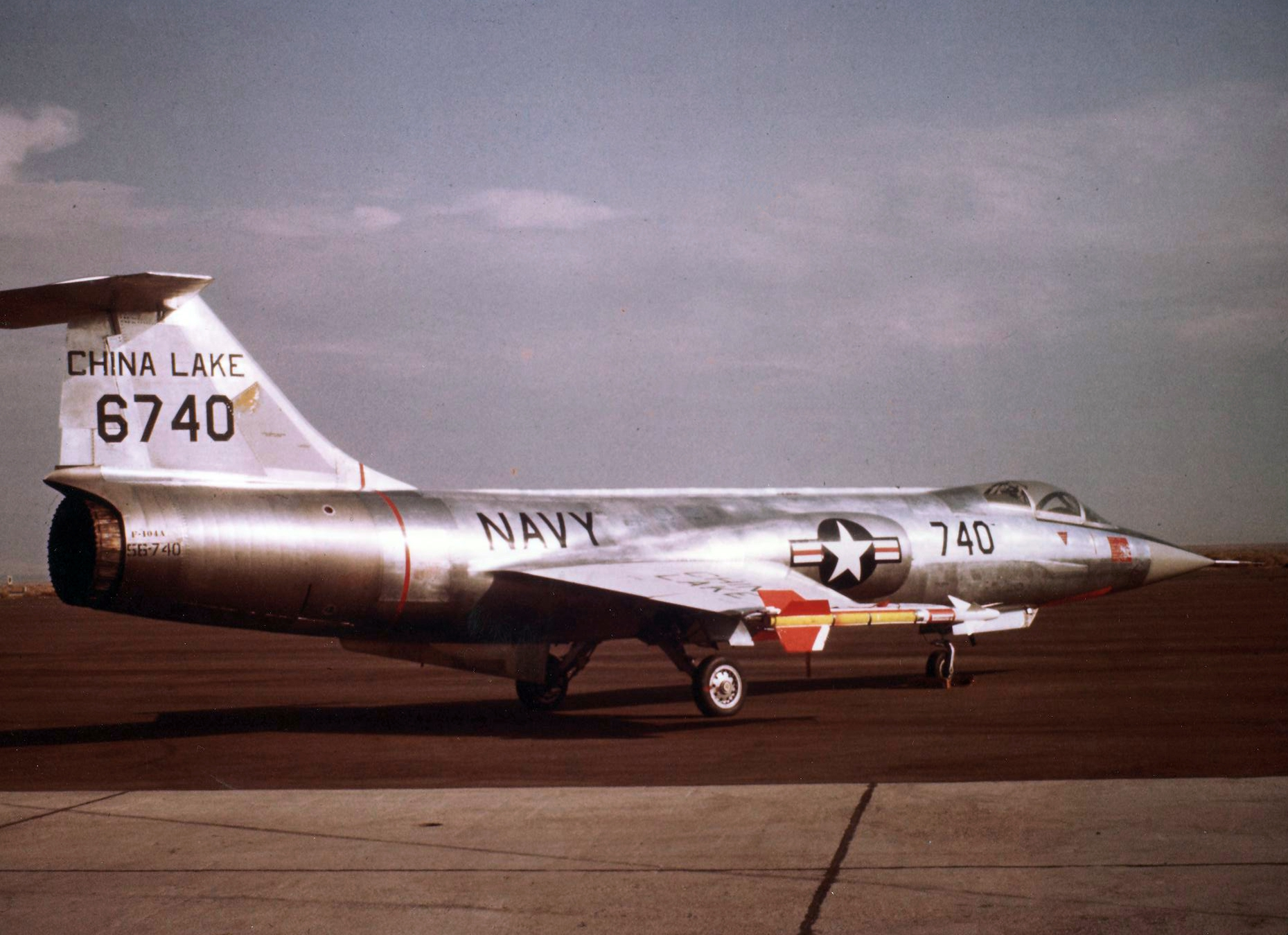
A USN F-104A with a Sidewinder 1-C missile at NWTC China Lake, 1960

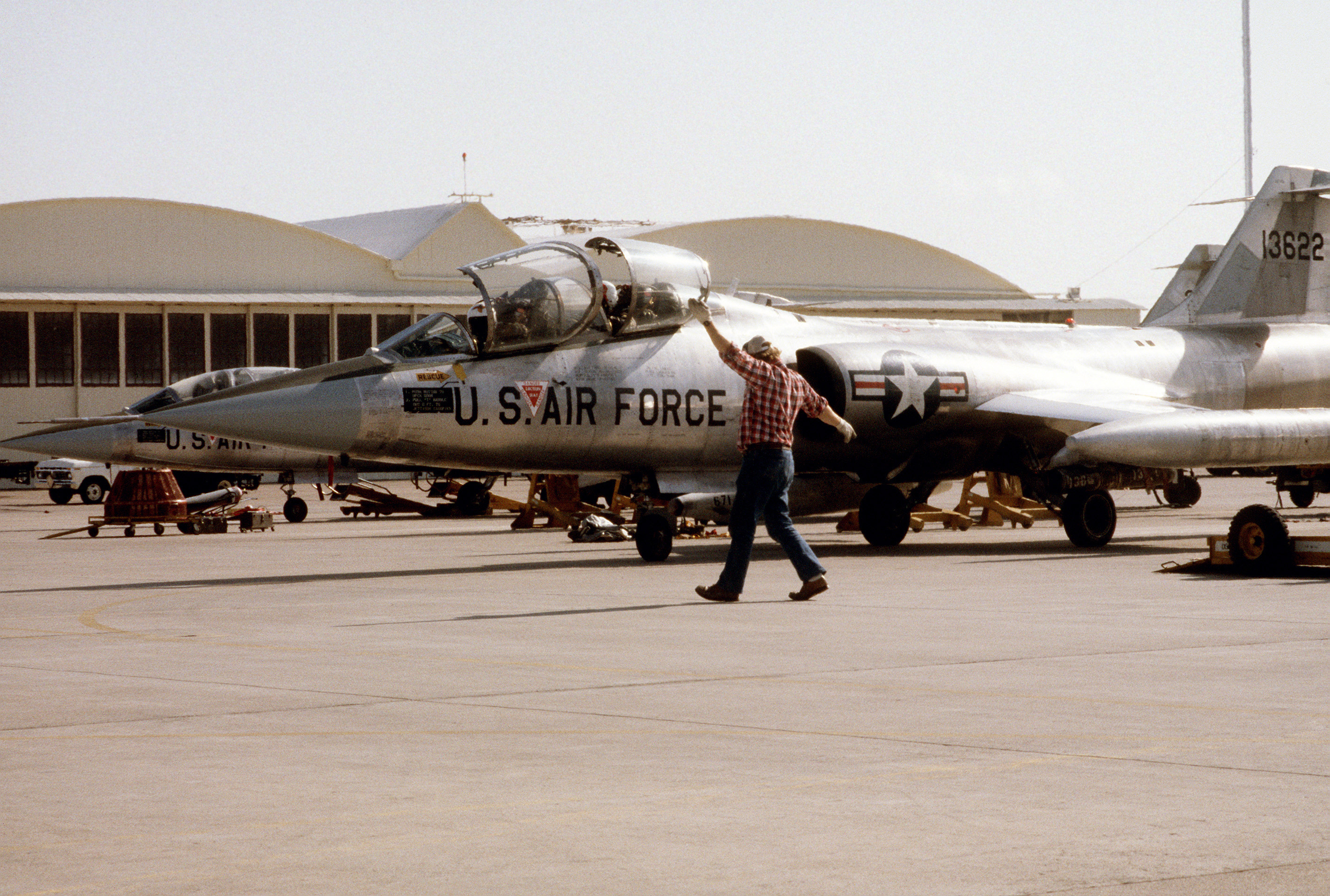
A German TF-104G at Luke AFB, 1982

By the late 1950s, USAF fighter doctrine had shifted away from air superiority (fighter against fighter combat) and placed more importance on the interceptor (fighter against bomber combat) and tactical fighter-bomber roles. The F-104 was deemed inadequate for either, lacking both payload capability and endurance in comparison with other USAF aircraft. As a result, the USAF procured only 296 Starfighters, including both single-seat and two-seat versions. During Operation Power Pack, USAF F-104s were deployed to Ramey Air Force Base to protect the American supply line against potential Soviet-supplied Cuban MiGs. Twelve F-104s were sent to Puerto Rico, where they remained until 3 June 1965. The F-104's service with the USAF was quickly wound down after the aircraft's second deployment to southeast Asia in 1967. Although the remaining F-104As in regular USAF service had been recently fitted with more powerful and reliable J79-GE-19 engines, the last USAF Starfighters left regular Air Force service in 1969. The aircraft continued in use with the Puerto Rico Air National Guard until 1975 when it was replaced by the A-7 Corsair II.

In 1959, the United States Navy (USN) Navy Weapons Training Center China Lake borrowed a YF-104A-2 and two F-104As to test the effectiveness of the AIM-9 Sidewinder missile at supersonic speeds. The aircraft were crewed by USAF 83rd FIS personnel. Most of the tests took place in 1960 and 1961. The two F-104As were lost to accidents, while the YF-104A completed the program safely and later was converted to a QF-104A drone.

The last use of the F-104 Starfighter in US markings was training pilots for the West German Air Force, with a wing of TF-104Gs and F-104Gs based at Luke Air Force Base, Arizona. Although operated in USAF markings, these aircraft (which included German-built aircraft) were owned by West Germany. They continued in use until 1983.

=== Pakistan Air Force ===
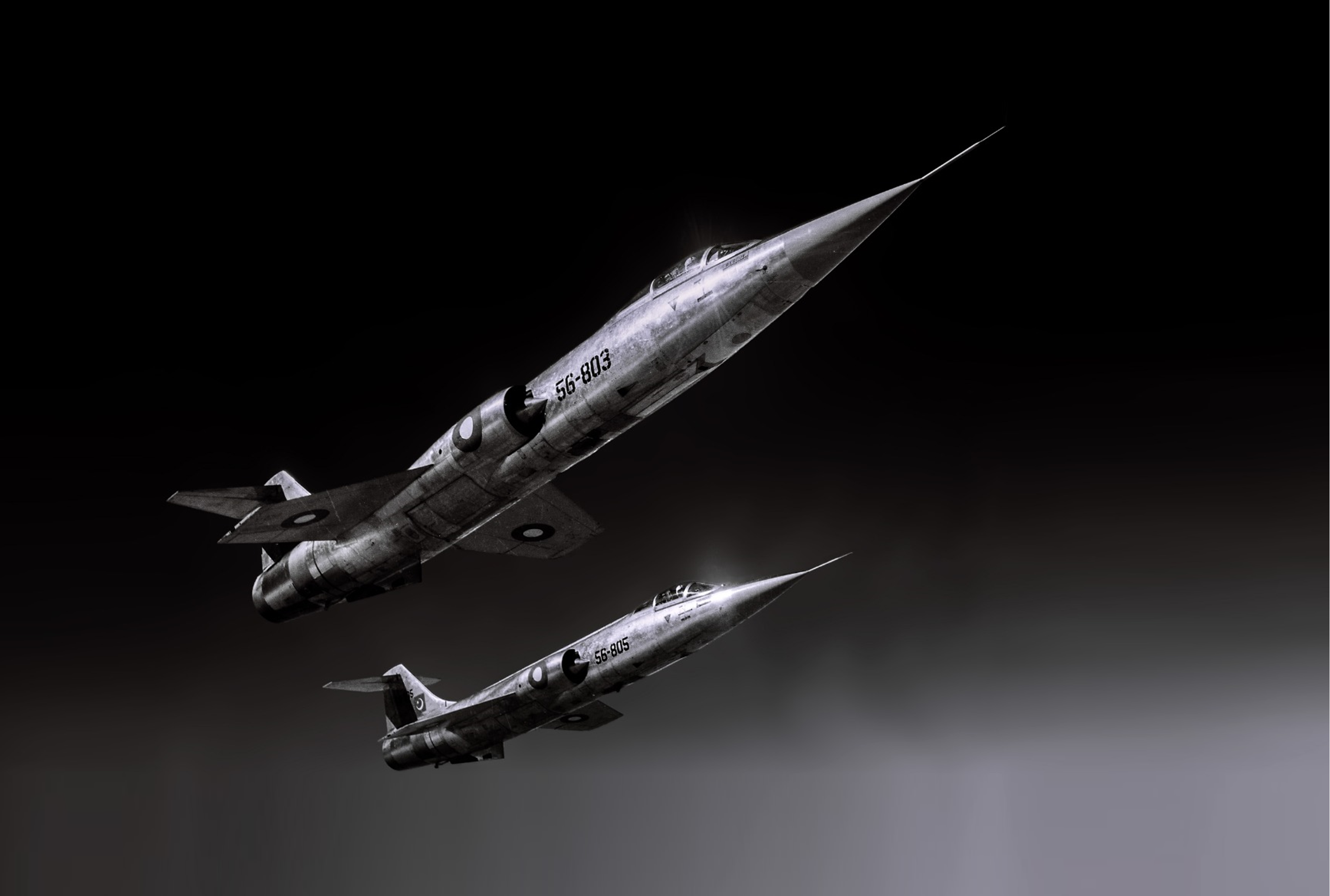
PAF Griffin F-104As during a training sortie in 1964.

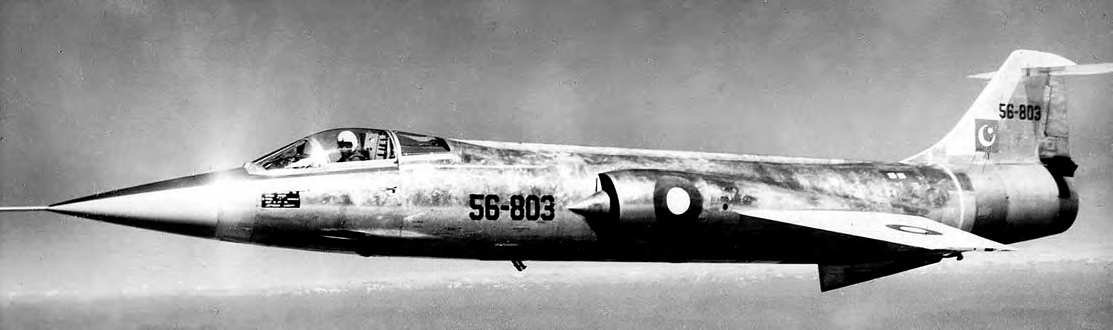
A PAF Griffin F-104A inflight in 1963.

In 1961, Pakistan received 12 F-104As and two dual-seat F-104Bs under the Mutual Assistance Program for major non-NATO allies. These were fitted with C-2 upward firing ejection seats, AN/ASG-14T1 fire control systems, more powerful General Electric J79-11A engines and the M-61 Vulcans were also re-fitted on Pakistan Air Force (PAF)'s request. Moreover, an F-104B was modified by the PAF to carry Swedish TA-7M reconnaissance cameras in the back seat, other than that a single F-104A was modified to carry Radar homing devices like the Radar Locator (RALOR) and Short-range Low Altitude Radar Detection (SLARD). The No. 9 Squadron "Griffins" was the only PAF squadron to be equipped with these Starfighters.

The PAF also provided F-104 instructors to Jordan after the Royal Jordanian Air Force started receiving its Starfighters in 1968. One of the Jordanian pilots, Major Ihsan Shurdom, later rose to command the RJAF. The PAF operated the F-104 until 1972, retiring it earlier than planned because US sanctions imposed after the Indo-Pakistani war of 1965 restricted access to spare parts.

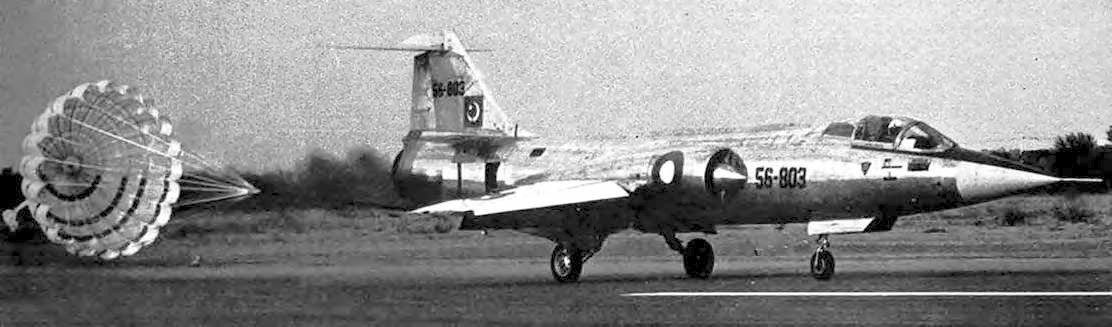
A Griffin F-104A landing after dissimilar air combat training.

==== Rann of Kutch Conflict ====
During the Rann of Kutch crisis in April 1965, which directly preceded 1965 War and is sometimes lumped into it, the a detachment of two Griffin F-104s was deployed at Mauripur Base under the command of Squadron Leader Middlecoat.

An F-104 flown by Farooq Umar also assisted the Army's 24th Cavalry, 15th Frontier Force and 15th Punjab regiments in capturing "Biar Bet" from Indian forces.

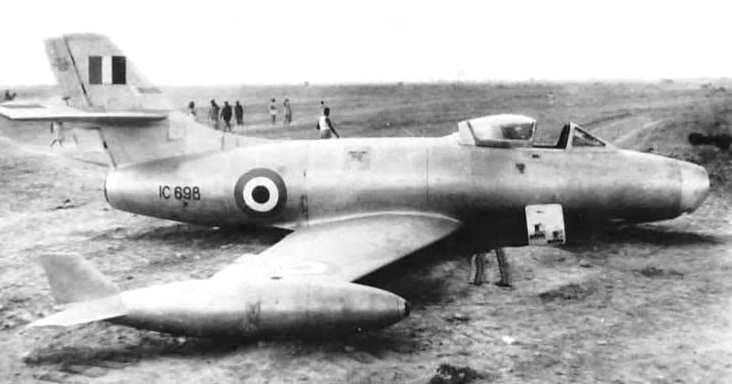
The Indian Dassault Ouragan which was forced down by Pakistani Starfighters.

Later in June, PAF F-104s forced an Indian Dassault Ouragan which had intruded into Pakistani airspace to make a forced landing at Jangshahi Village near Badin.

==== Indo-Pakistani war of 1965 ====
PAF F-104s were deployed in a variety of roles during the 1965 war. These included Air defence, high altitude interceptions, night fighter, reconnaissance etc.

In the opening rounds of the war on 1 September, Flight Lt. Farooq Umar on the orders of PAF's C-in-C Air Marshal Nur Khan, executed two sonic booms in his F-104 over the enemy airbase at Amritsar. This was done in order to harass the Indian Air Force (IAF) as a sign of dominance.

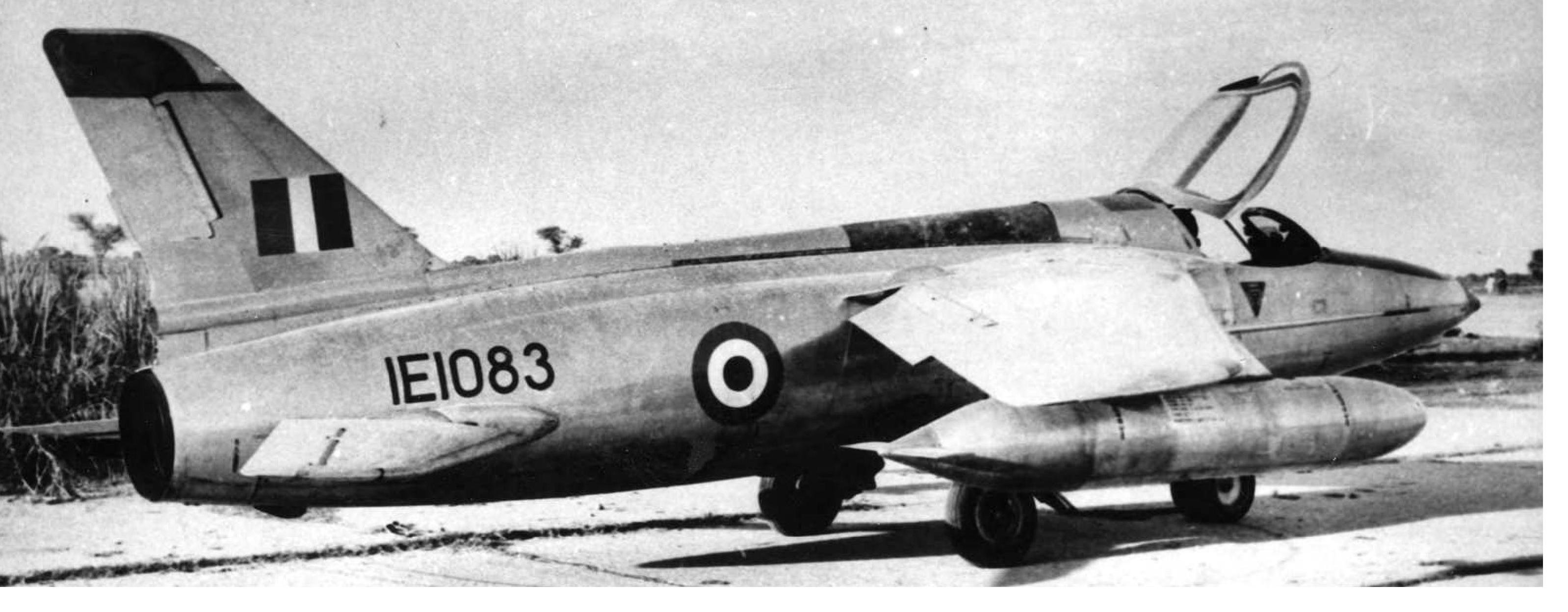
An Indian Gnat F.1 (IE-1083) sits on the disused airfield at Pasrur shortly after being forced down by a Griffin F-104A on 3 September 1965. Today, the Gnat is on display at PAF Museum at Karachi.

On 3 September 1965, two Griffin F-104As flown by Flying Officer Abbas Mirza and Flight Lieutenant Hakimullah intercepted 6 IAF Folland Gnats over Akhnur which had attacked a lone F-86 Sabre. While the Sabre managed to return to base despite sustaining heavy damage, the Starfighters made supersonic passes near the Indian Gnats. In the ensuing chaos, Squadron Ldr. Brij Pal Singh Sikand landed his Gnat F.1 at an abandoned Pakistani airstrip at Pasrur mistaking it for an Indian Airfield.

The F-104s first air to air combat victory was achieved by the PAF on the morning of 6 September 1965, when a pair of Griffin F-104As flown by Flight Lieutenant Aftab Alam Khan and Flight Lieutenant Amjad Hussain Khan were vectored towards 4 Indian Dassault Mystere IVs that were attacking a passenger train at Ghakhar Station. While Flight Lt. Amjad aborted due to radio failure, Flight Lt. Aftab went ahead with the interception and shot down a Mystere IV with an AIM-9B while damaging another with his M-61 Vulcan. The kill with an AIM-9B Sidewinder is claimed by the PAF as the first combat kill by any Mach 2 aircraft and the PAF's first missile kill, though this kill is unconfirmed as the IAF disputes losing the aircraft.

On 7 September 1965, a Griffin F-104A flown by Flight Lt. Amjad Hussein Khan intercepted six Indian Dassault Mysteres which were attacking the Sargodha Airbase. While 5 of the Indian Mysteres managed to escape, a fierce dogfight ensued between Flight Lt. Amjad's F-104 & Squadron Ldr. Devaiah's Mystere. Amjad fired an AIM-9B but it missed and hit the ground so he switched to his M-61 cannon and after some attempts, managed to score several hits on Devaiah's Mystere. However, due to high-G maneuvering, Amjad's F-104 was forced into a low speed dogfight by a determined Devaiah (something which the F-104 performs badly in due to its poor low speed maneuverability and agility.) This forced Amjad to ram his F-104 into the Mystere. The mid-air collision resulted in both pilots losing control of their warplanes. While Flight Lt. Amjad managed to eject safely over Kot Nakka, the Indian pilot perished with his Mystere. Squadron Ldr. Devaiah was posthumously awarded the Maha Vir Chakra (India's second highest award for gallantry) for his actions during this engagement. On 13 September 1965, Middlecoat fired an AIM-9 at an IAF Canberra bomber during a night interception. An explosion was reported at around 4000 ft but confirmation was not possible.

On 21 September 1965, Squadron Leader Jamal while flying a Griffin F-104A intercepted a high flying IAF English Electric Canberra at night and shot it down with an AIM-9 near Fazilka over Pakistani airspace.

In total, Pakistani F-104s flew 246 hours and 45 minutes during the 1965 war, 204 day sorties and 42 night missions.

==== Indo-Pakistani War of 1971 ====
The commencement of hostilities in 1971 led to PAF deploying its small fleet of F-104s heavily in Air to Air and Ground Attack roles. Surplus F-104As and F-104Bs were also received from Jordan.

===== Ground attack =====
In early December 1971, PAF launched Operation Chengiz Khan (inspired from Israel's Operation Focus) after a series of invasions by Indian forces in East Pakistan. As part of these preemptive strikes, the Starfighters were employed particularly in attacks on various Indian radar stations.

On 3 December 1971, a formation of two Starfighters attacked the IAF Radar station at Amritsar.

On 4 December 1971, Squadron leaders Amanullah and Rashid Bhatti flying F-104As again struck the IAF's Amritsar radar without any significant results due to heavy Anti-Aircraft fire.

On 11 December, two F-104As piloted by Wing Commander Arif Iqbal Squadron Leader M. Amanullah struck the Indian airbase of Uttarlai during which Squadron Ldr. Amanullah destroyed an HF-24 parked on the tarmac with his M-61 cannon while Flight Lt. Arif Iqbal strafed another HF-24 which was trying to take off from the airbase.

===== Air-to-air Combat =====
On 4 December 1971, a Folland Gnat and Sukhoi Su-7 were shot down after they confronted a formation of two PAF Starfighters attacking the Amritsar radar.

On 8 December, an F-104 piloted by Flight Lieutenant Manzoor Bokhari intercepted a Canberra bomber and shot it down.

On 10 December, an F-104 flown by Wing Commander Arif Iqbal shot down an Indian Navy Bréguet 1050 Alizé while attacking the Okha Port.

On the morning of 12 December, the first direct air-to-air combat engagement between an F-104 and a MiG-21 took place when OC No. 9 Squadron, Middlecoat along with his wingman Tariq Habib while performing airstrikes on the IAF's Jamnagar Airbase were bounced by two Indian MiG-21FLs of the No. 47 Squadron. While the F-104 formation was returning to Pakistani territory, one of the MiG-21s fired a K-13 missile at Mervyn's F-104. Though he managed to dodge it with evasive maneuvers, a second missile was fired at a range of 300 meters this time hitting his Starfighter. Middlecoat was seen ejecting over the Gulf of Kutch however the Indian vessels dispatched to capture him claimed he was never found. The PAF initially declared him MIA but was later declared KIA and posthumously awarded a Bar to Sitara-e-Jurat.

The second F-104 loss occurred several days later on 17 December when a pair of Jordanian loaned Starfighters on combat air patrol near Hyderabad intercepted two MiG-21s which had intruded Pakistani airspace. The wingman, Flight Lieutenant Samad Ali Changezi engaged one of the MiG-21s and managed to get behind its tail. Unknown to him the second MiG-21 had sneaked up behind him and had fired a K-13 missile which had missed. His leader tried warning him but to no avail. As Changezi was about to shoot the MiG-21 down, a second K-13 was fired by the pursuing IAF MiG-21 which slammed into his F-104. The Starfighter went down over Mirpur Khas along with its pilot. Changezi was posthumously awarded the Sitara-e-Jurat in honor of his wartime service. The IAF also claims two additional PAF Starfighter kills that same day including Squadron Leader Rashid Bhatti's Starfighter. However, the PAF said he returned without damage to Masroor AFB.

=== Taiwan ===
==== 1967 Taiwan Strait Conflict ====
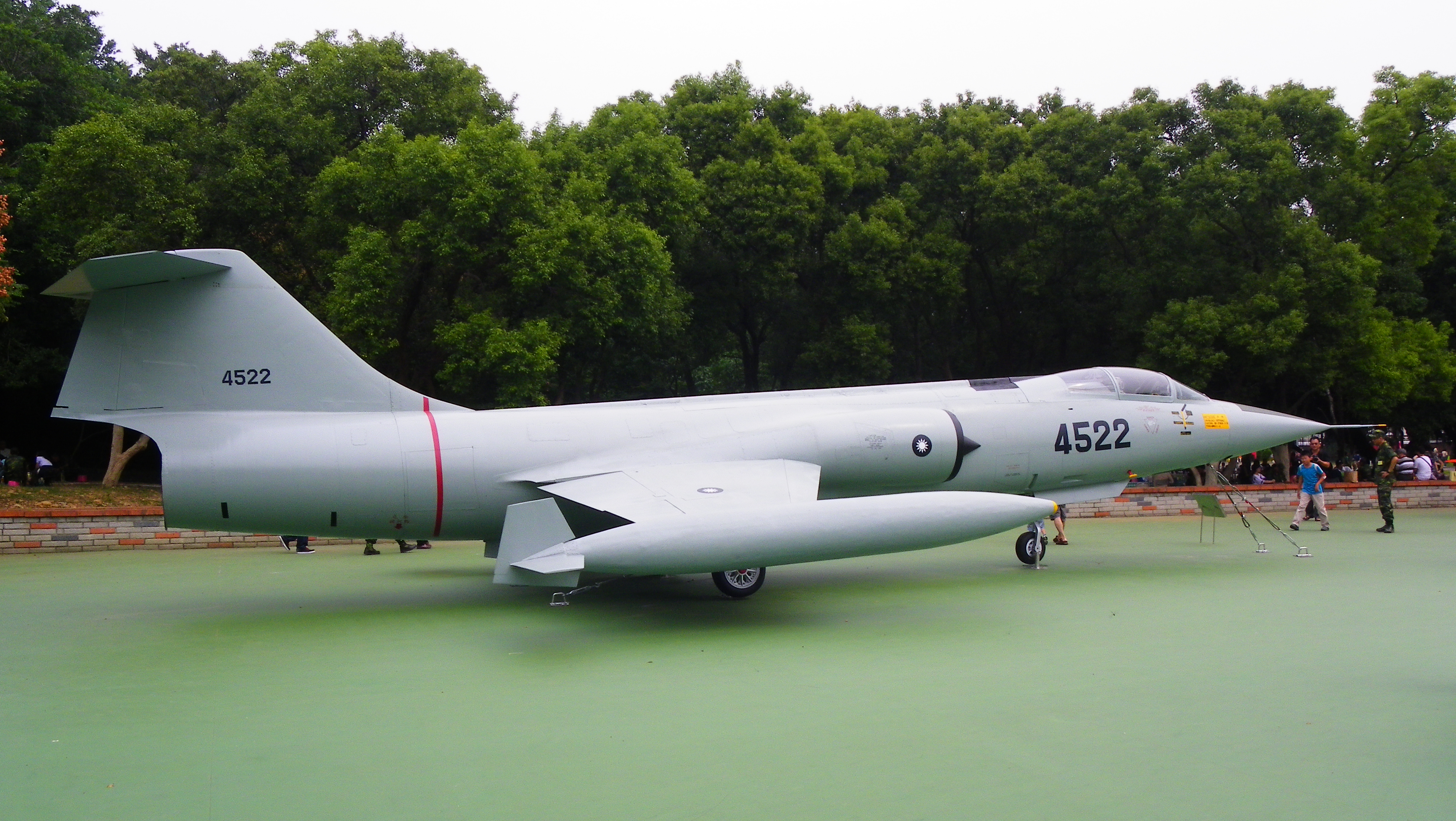
Republic of China (Taiwan) Air Force F-104J

On 13 January 1967, four ROCAF F-104G aircraft engaged a formation of J-6/MiG-19s of the People's Liberation Army Air Force over the disputed island of Kinmen (Quemoy). Major Hu Shih-lin and Captain Shih Pei-po each shot down one MiG-19. One F-104 did not return to base and its pilot was listed as missing in action.

This was the final direct-battle engagement between the PRC and ROC of the Cold War era, and is popularly referred to as the 113 Air Battle, which has also become known as a scandal between military and public affairs; of the four F-104 Starfighters that engaged the J-6/MiG-19s that day, it has been revealed that the F-104 piloted by Major Yang Ching-tsung was lost at some point during the battle with the MiG-19s, or soon thereafter, to which the news of this suspicious loss was withheld from the public. However, the wife of Major Yang threatened to hold a public news conference regarding how her husband was not being honored for his ultimate sacrifice, and had to be restrained by RoCAF officials, telling her that "We're preparing to retake China and revive our country, and we have to maintain the morale of our people and military. It’s best that we don’t announce any negative news", while promising to take good care of her and her family.

In aftermath of the 113 Air Battle, F-104 designer Kelly Johnson stated that this particular battle illustrated the relative strengths and weaknesses of the Starfighter in aerial combat. "We had them on acceleration and we had them on steady-state altitude, but we could not turn with them," said Johnson, who at the time was working on the larger-winged, more-maneuverable CL-1200 Lancer derivative of the F-104.

=== Other international service ===
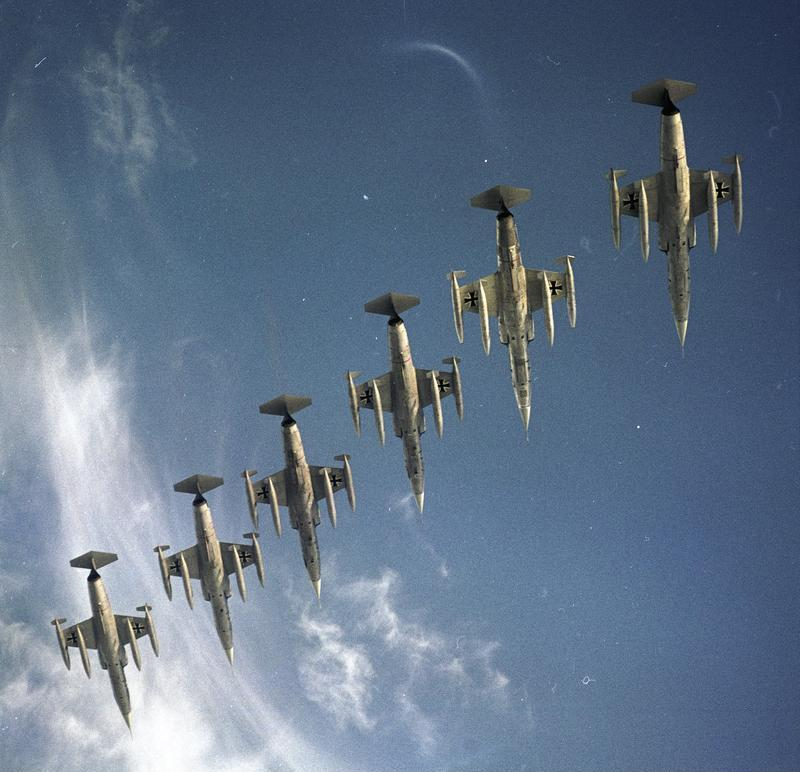
F-104Gs from Marinefliegergeschwader 1, 1965

At the same time that the F-104 was falling out of U.S. favor, the West German Air Force was looking for a multi-role combat aircraft to operate in support of a missile defense system. In response, Lockheed reworked the Starfighter from a fair-weather fighter into an all-weather ground-attack, reconnaissance, and interceptor aircraft, and presented it as the F-104G. The redesigned aircraft was chosen over the English Electric P.1 (later the Lightning), Grumman F11F-1F Super Tiger, Vought F-8 Crusader and Republic F-105 Thunderchief. Ten other aircraft types, including the F-102, F-106, Saunders-Roe SR.177, and the Saab 35 Draken, were also considered but discarded earlier in the process. The F-104G was ultimately chosen because the other two finalists were still in the development phase while the F-104 was about to be introduced into USAF service; although the American version lacked all-weather capability, Lockheed promised they could deliver this, and favorable reports by the German Ministry of Defence delegation sent in December 1957 to flight-test the F-104 tipped the scales in the Starfighter's favor.

The Starfighter found a new market with other NATO countries as well, and eventually more than 2,000 of all variants of the F-104 were built for international air forces. Several countries received their aircraft under the U.S. government-funded Military Aid Program (MAP). The American engine was retained but built under license in Europe, Canada, and Japan. The Lockheed ejector seats were retained initially but were replaced in some countries by the safer Martin-Baker seat.

The so-called "Deal of the Century" produced substantial income for Lockheed, but the resulting bribery scandals caused considerable political controversy in Europe and Japan. In 1976, a United States Senate investigating committee led by Senator Frank Church determined that Lockheed had paid US$22 million in bribes to foreign officials during the negotiation processes for the sale of its aircraft, including the F-104 Starfighter. In Germany, Minister of Defence Franz Josef Strauss was accused of having received at least US$10 million for West Germany's purchase of the F-104 in 1961. On 26 August 1976, Prince-consort Bernhard of the Netherlands was forced to resign as Inspector-General of the Dutch Armed Forces after being accused of accepting approximately US$1.1 million in bribes.

In the Netherlands, the F-104 was used to aid in the ending of the 1977 Dutch train hijacking. On 11 June 1977, almost three weeks after the start of a hijacking of a train by Moluccan separatists, six F-104 jet fighters of the Royal Netherlands Air Force overflew the train three times at low altitude, using their afterburners to disorient the hijackers as a precursor to an armed attack by Dutch marines. None of the Starfighters used their weapons.

The international service of the F-104 began to wind down in the late 1970s, being replaced in many cases by the General Dynamics F-16 Fighting Falcon, but it remained in service with some air forces for another two decades. The last operational Starfighters served with the Italian Air Force, which retired them on 31 October 2004.

=== NASA ===
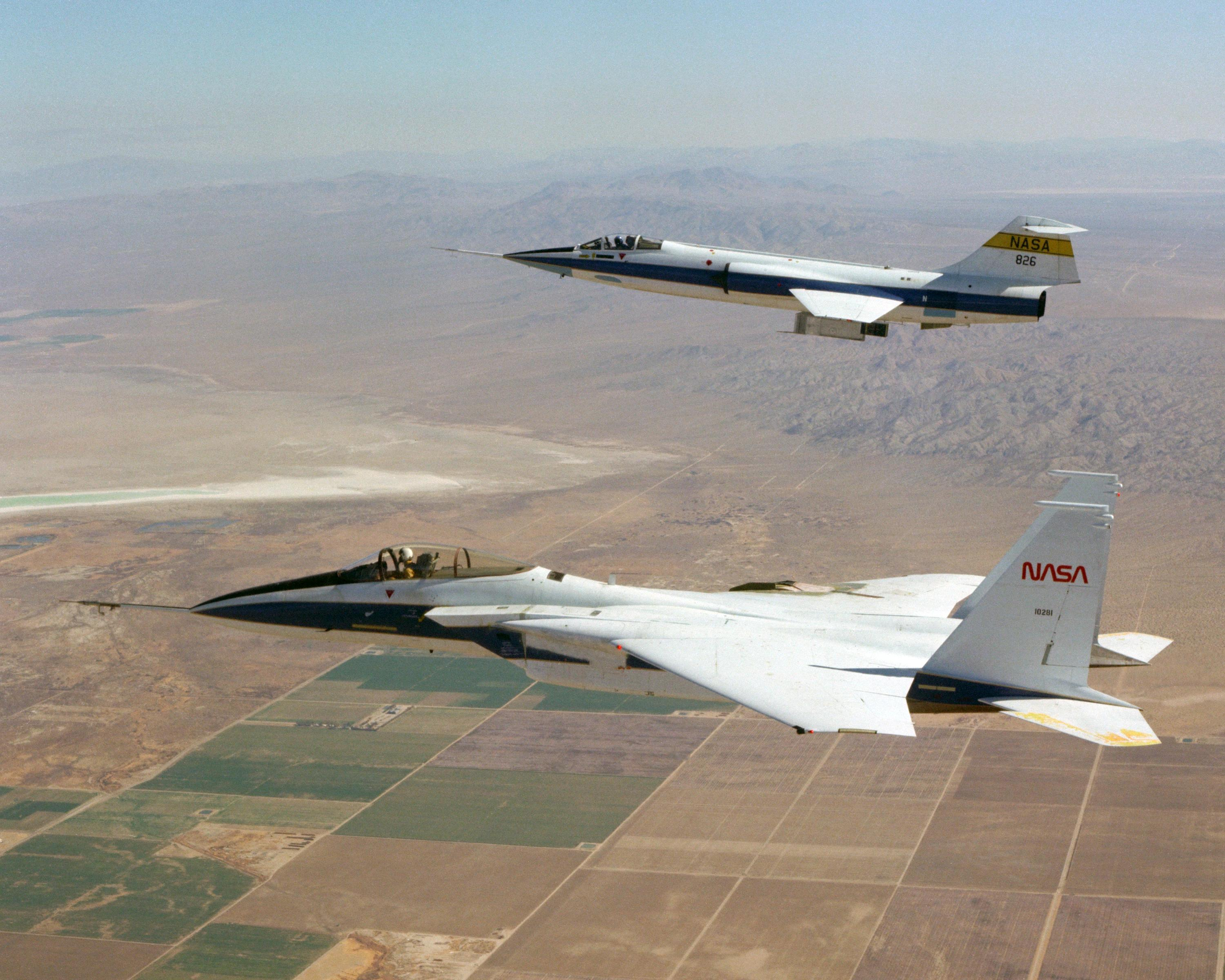
NASA F-15 and F-104 testing Space Shuttle tiles

The Starfighter served with NASA from 1956 until 1994. A total of 12 F-104A, F-104B, F-104N, and TF-104G aircraft performed high-speed and altitude flight research at Dryden Flight Research Center. The F-104 also performed many safety chase missions in support of advanced research aircraft and provided a launch platform for sounding rockets.

In August 1956, the USAF transferred YF-104A serial number 55–2961 to the National Advisory Committee for Aeronautics (NACA, the predecessor of NASA), designating it NF-104A. In preparation for the X-15 test program of the late 1950s, it was fitted with the reaction control system (RCS) consisting of hydrogen peroxide-powered thrusters mounted in the aircraft's nose and wingtips. This system provided valuable experience for future X-15 pilots and astronauts in spacecraft control and maneuverability. The trials began in 1959 and concluded in 1961, after which the aircraft was used for other NASA purposes until it was retired in November 1975.

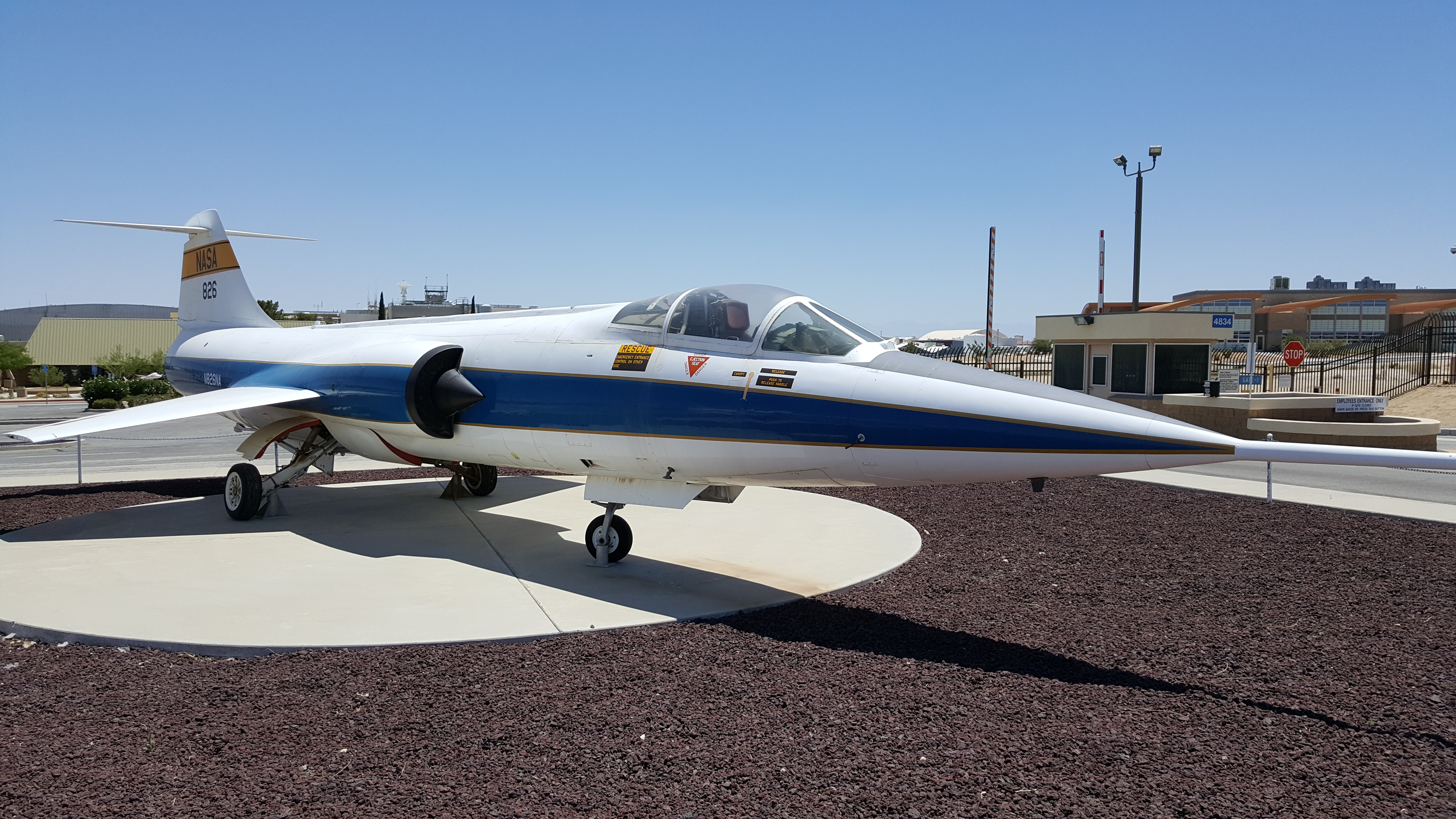
NASA F-104 on display at Edwards Air Force Base.

An F-104B, originally USAF 57-1303 later received civil registry as N819NA, NASA 819. It became the longest-serving NASA F-104 in both calendar time (1958–1978) and flight hours. Its credits include being the first aircraft in history to perform manned testing of a ballute at supersonic speed. It was also the first to test piloted landings of vehicles such as the X-15 and lifting bodies with the pilot using only stereo periscopic vision. It was used extensively for biomedical research, evaluation of new full pressure suits, and general utility duties for NASA research. One notable case was its service as the final chase plane for the official FAI world altitude record flight of the #3 X-15.

Training for Space (1962) Official NASA NF-104 information film reel.

Between August and October 1963, Lockheed delivered three single-seat F-104G Starfighters to NASA, designated F-104N, for use as high-speed chase aircraft. These were the only Starfighters built by Lockheed specifically for NASA; all other NASA aircraft were transferred from the USAF. The third of these F-104Ns, number 013, was destroyed on 8 June 1966 in a mid-air collision with a North American XB-70 during a publicity photo flight for General Electric.

One NASA F-104G, registration N826NA, was equipped with a flight test fixture (FTF) consisting of a pylon mounted on the fuselage centerline. The FTF contained instruments to record and transmit research data in real-time to engineers in mission control at Dryden. One application of the FTF was testing heat-resistant tiles for use on the Space Shuttle, ensuring their bonding was sufficient at high speeds and evaluating their performance when exposed to moisture. The last of these missions flew on 31 January 1994, bringing the F-104's service with NASA to a close after more than 18,000 flights.

=== Use as space launch platform ===
In 2011, 4Frontiers Corporation and Starfighters Inc (a private F-104 operator) began working together on a project to launch suborbital sounding rockets from F-104s flying out of Kennedy Space Center. First launches were expected to occur in 2012. In early 2016, another venture, CubeCab, was working on a rocket system that would launch CubeSats from F-104s. The company said it planned to begin providing launch services "in early 2020".

=== World records ===
The F-104 was the first aircraft to simultaneously hold the world speed and altitude records. On 7 May 1958, USAF Major Howard C. Johnson, flying YF-104A 55–2957, broke the world flight altitude record for jet aircraft by flying to 91,243 feet (27,811 m) (Note: FAI record no. 5056.) over Edwards AFB. On 16 May 1958, USAF Captain Walter W. Irwin, flying YF-104A 55–2969, set a world flight airspeed record of 1,404.012 miles per hour (2,259.538 km/h) over a course 15 miles (24 km) long at Edwards AFB. Flying F-104A 56–0762 over NAS Point Mugu, California, USAF Lieutenants William T. Smith and Einar Enevoldson set several time-to-climb records on 13 and 14 December 1958:

Altitude meters (feet)	time seconds
3,000 (9,800)	41.85
6,000 (19,700)	58.41
9,000 (29,500)	81.14
12,000 (39,400)	99.90
15,000 (49,200)	131.10
20,000 (65,600)	222.99
25,000 (82,000)	266.03

On 14 December 1959, USAF Captain "Joe" B. Jordan, flying F-104C 56–0885 at Edwards AFB, set a new world altitude record of 103,389 feet (31,513 m), in the process becoming the first aircraft to take off under its own power and cross both the 30,000-meter and 100,000-foot thresholds. He also set a 30,000-meter (98,400 ft) time-to-climb record of 904.92 seconds. (Note: The lower-altitude records were surpassed in February 1962 by the Northrop T-38 Talon, and soon after all of the time-to-climb records were broken by the F-4 Phantom. The T-38 time-to-climb records are ID numbers 8718, 8604, 8599, and 8719 in the FAI database.) USAF Major Robert W. Smith, flying NF-104A 56–0756, set an unofficial world altitude record of 118,860 ft (36,230 m) on 15 November 1963, and on 6 December 1963 he flew the same aircraft to another unofficial altitude record of 120,800 ft (36,800 m).

Jacqueline Cochran, a lieutenant colonel in the United States Air Force Reserve, flew TF-104G N104L to set three women's world's speed records: On 11 May 1964, she averaged 1,429.3 miles per hour (2,300.2 km/h) over a 15–25 km (9.3–15.5 mi) course, on 1 June she flew at an average speed of 1,303.18 miles per hour (2,097.26 km/h) over a 100 km (62 mi) closed-circuit course, and on 3 June she recorded an average speed of 1,127.4 miles per hour (1,814.4 km/h) over a 500 km (310 mi) closed-circuit course.

Lockheed test pilot Darryl Greenamyer built an F-104 out of parts he had collected. The aircraft, N104RB, first flew in 1976. On 2 October of that year, trying to set a new low-altitude 3 km (1.9 mi) speed record, Greenamyer averaged 1,010 miles per hour (1,630 km/h) at Mud Lake near Tonopah, Nevada. A tracking camera malfunction eliminated the necessary proof for the official record. On 24 October 1977, Greenamyer flew a 3 km (1.9 mi) official FAI record flight of 1,590.45 km/h (988.26 mph).

On 26 February 1978, Greenamyer made a practice run for a world altitude record attempt. At the conclusion of the practice run, he was unable to get an indication that the right landing gear was down and locked even after a number of attempts to cycle the gear. Low on fuel and faced with a landing situation that was not considered survivable, Greenamyer successfully ejected, and the N104RB crashed in the desert.

=== Nicknames ===
The Starfighter was marketed by Lockheed as the "missile with a man in it", and the press dubbed the F-104 the "Widowmaker" due to its high accident rate, but neither were used in service. The term "Super Starfighter" was used by Lockheed to describe the F-104G in its marketing campaigns, but quickly fell into disuse.

In service, it earned a number of nicknames among its users:

- American pilots initially called it the "Oh-Four", but when the F-100 Super Sabre began to be referred to as the "Zip-Zilch" (for "zero-zero"), the Starfighter acquired the similar nickname "Zip-Four"; this was eventually shortened to "Zipper" or "Zip". Over time this nickname came to be associated with the aircraft's impressive speed and acceleration.
- The Japan Air Self-Defense Force called it Eiko (Kanji: 栄光, "glory").
- Although German pilots often referred to the F-104 as the "Zipper" or (specifically the G models) "Gustav", it earned several less-charitable names from the German public due to its high accident rate, common ones being Witwenmacher ("widowmaker") or Fliegender Sarg ("flying coffin"). It was also called Erdnagel ("ground nail"), the official military term for a tent peg.
- Prior to the Indo-Pakistani War of 1965, the reputation of the Pakistani F-104 was such that the Indian Air Force referred to it as Badmash ("hooligan"), "Scoundrel", and "Wicked One".
- Among Italian pilots its spiky design earned it the nickname Spillone ("hatpin").
- Among the Norwegian public and Royal Norwegian Air Force it was affectionately known as Vestfjordoksen ("the Vestfjord bull"), due to the immense roar of the aircraft based in Bodø, at the southern end of Vestfjorden.
- In the Canadian Forces, the aircraft was sometimes referred to as the "Lawn Dart" and the "Aluminium Death Tube" due to its high operational losses, and "Flying Phallus" due to its shape. It was affectionately called the "Silver Sliver", "Zipper", or "Zip", but most often the "Starfighter" or simply the "104" (one-oh-four).
- NASA's F-104B Starfighter N819NA acquired the nickname "Howling Howland" due to the unique howling sound of its engine at certain throttle settings.

== Flying characteristics ==
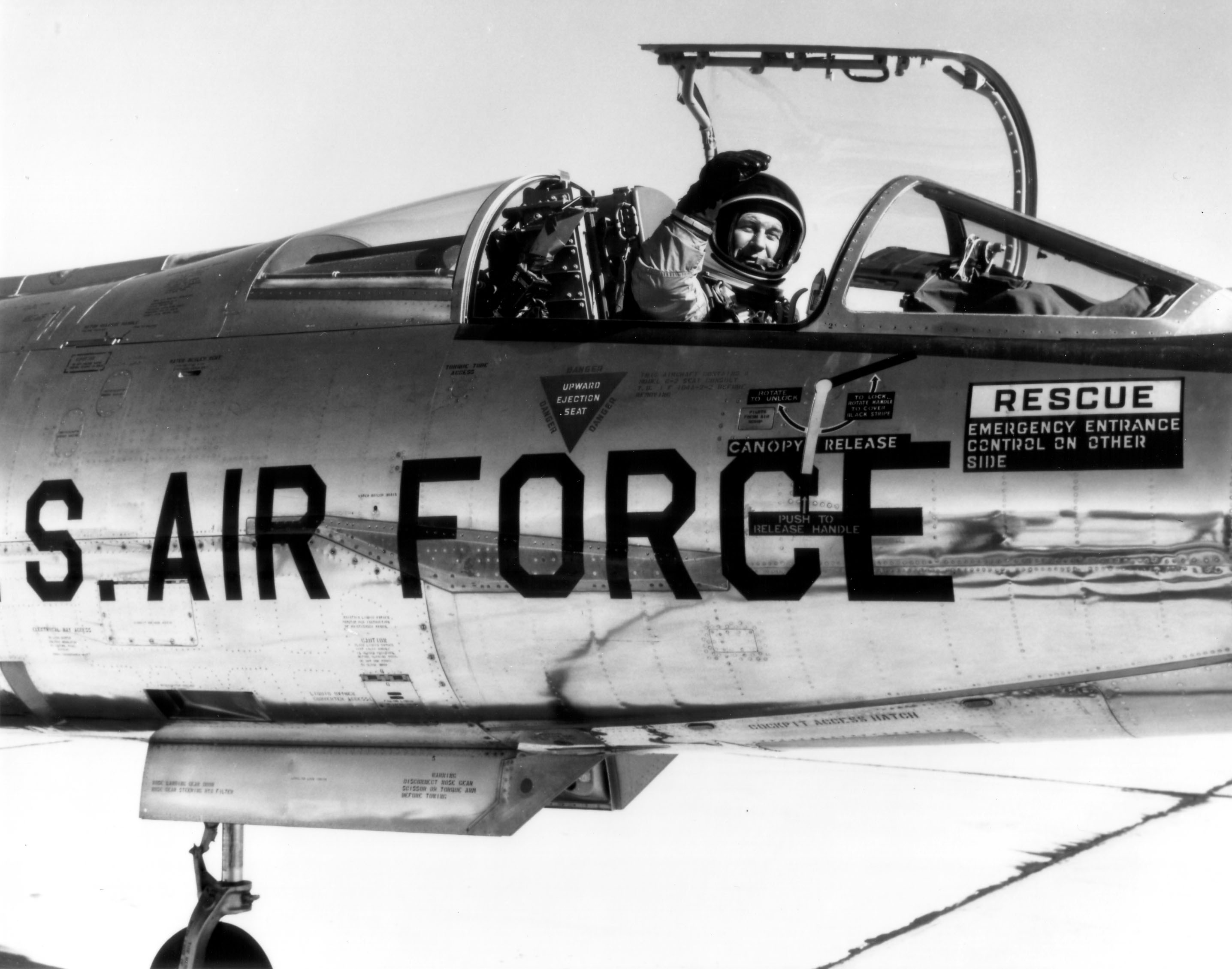
Chuck Yeager in the cockpit of an NF-104, 4 December 1963

The Starfighter was the first combat aircraft capable of sustained Mach 2 flight, and its speed and climb performance remained impressive more than thirty years after its first flight. Equipped with razor-edge thin-blade supersonic wings (visible from the cockpit only in the mirrors), it was designed for optimum performance above Mach 1.2. If used appropriately, with high-speed surprise attacks and good use of its exceptional thrust-to-weight ratio, it could be a formidable opponent. It was exceptionally stable at high speed, i.e., over 600 knots (1,100 km/h; 690 mph), at very low level, making it a potent tactical nuclear strike-fighter. However, in a low-speed turning contest with conventional subsonic opponents (as Pakistani pilots were with Indian Mystères in 1965), the fighter was vulnerable. The F-104's large turn radius was due to the high speeds required for maneuvering, and its high-alpha stalling and pitch-up behavior required attentiveness from its pilot. In reference to the F-104's low-speed turn performance, a humorous colloquialism was coined by a pilot in the skies over Edwards Air Force Base: "Banking with intent to turn."

De-classified Tactical Weapons Effects Tests of the U.S. Air-Force Century-Series aircraft.

Takeoff speeds were between 180 and 200 knots (330 and 370 km/h; 210 and 230 mph), with the pilot needing to swiftly raise the landing gear to avoid exceeding the maximum landing gear operating speed of 260 knots (480 km/h; 300 mph). Climb and cruise performance were outstanding; occasionally a "slow" light would illuminate on the instrument panel at around Mach 2 to indicate that the engine compressor was nearing its limiting temperature and the pilot needed to throttle back. Landings were also performed at high speed: the downwind leg of the circuit was typically flown at approximately 210 knots (390 km/h; 240 mph) with flaps in landing configuration, with the long, flat final approach flown at around 175 knots (324 km/h; 201 mph) and touchdown at 155 to 160 knots (287 to 296 km/h; 178 to 184 mph). Extra fuel, crosswinds or gusts, external stores, and other considerations could add up to 20 knots (37 km/h; 23 mph) to these speeds. Unlike most aircraft, the F-104 was landed with the engine at high power, as the boundary-layer control system lost effectiveness below approximately 82% engine speed. Pilots were instructed not to cut the throttle while the plane was still airborne, as doing so would cause an abrupt (and generally uneven) loss of lift. To limit the Starfighter's landing roll, or distance traveled while decelerating from touchdown to taxi speed, powerful brakes were combined with a 16-foot (4.9 m) drag chute.

=== Early problems ===
The F-104 series all had a very high wing loading (made even higher when carrying external stores). During the early stall tests, the aircraft demonstrated the tendency to suddenly "pitch up" once it reached an angle of attack of approximately 15 degrees. This "pitch up" would result in a rapid increase in angle of attack to approximately 60 degrees, accompanied by lateral and directional oscillation, and followed by sudden uncontrolled yaw and roll. At this point the aircraft would be essentially tumbling, descending at a rate of 12,000–15,000 feet per minute (3,700–4,600 m/min). To combat this, an automatic pitch control (APC) was added, which initiated corrective action at the proper time to prevent reaching an angle of attack high enough to cause pitch-up under any operating condition. The high angle of attack area of flight was protected by a stick shaker system to warn the pilot of an approaching stall, and if this was ignored, a stick pusher system would pitch the aircraft's nose down to a safer angle of attack; this was often overridden by the pilot despite flight manual warnings against this practice.

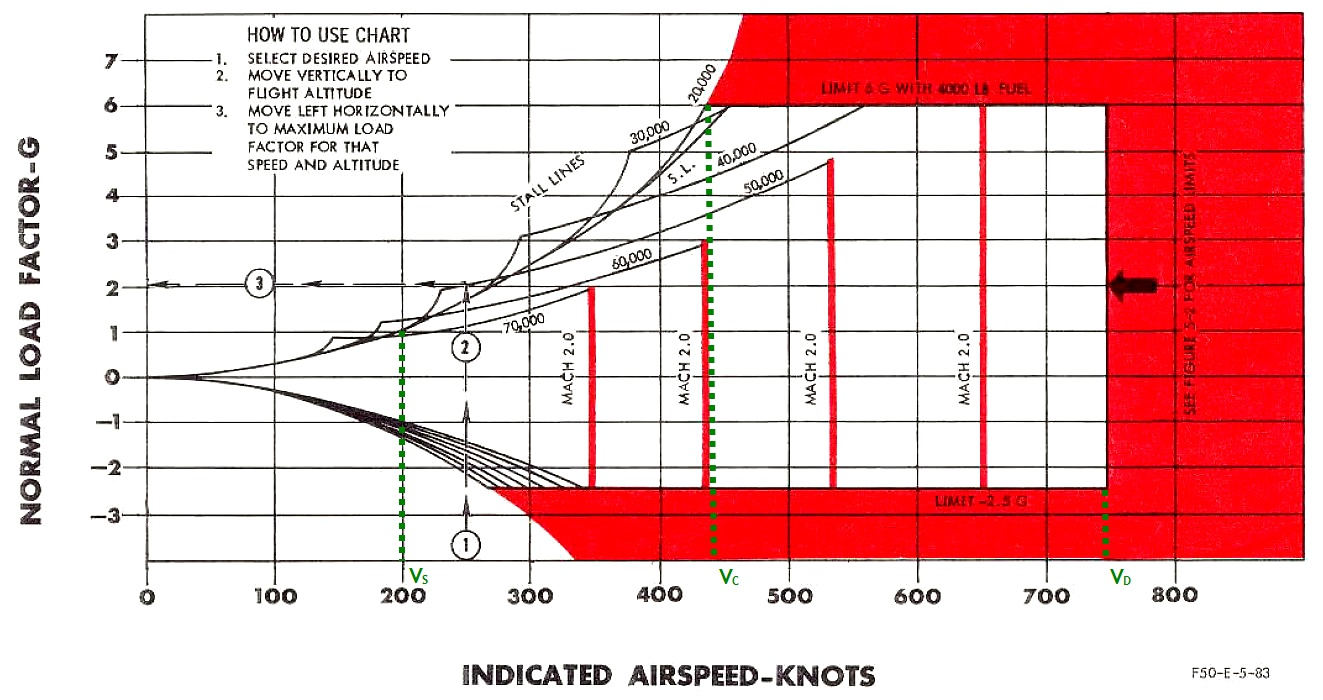
F-104A flight envelope

Another serious design issue that the aircraft encountered was T-tail flutter. Dick Heppe, who served as the initial project aerodynamics engineer for the F-104 program, recalled that "without question, the single most difficult technical challenge encountered in the XF-104 and F-104A development programs was the catastrophic flutter problem of the unique T-tailed empennage configuration". Because the horizontal tail's center of gravity was well aft of both the bending and torsional axes of the vertical tail to which it was attached, it was highly vulnerable to flutter at transonic speeds. During a test flight of the F-104A, the surviving XF-104 was flying chase to observe, and encountered violent T-tail flutter that caused the tail to separate from the aircraft. The test pilot of the XF-104 successfully ejected. This behavior was remedied by increasing the thickness of the stainless-steel box covers used in the tail assembly.

The J79 was a brand-new engine, with development continuing throughout the YF-104A test phase and during service with the F-104A. The engine featured variable-incidence compressor stator blades, a design feature that altered the angle of the stator blades automatically with altitude and temperature. A condition known as "T-2 reset", a normal function that made large stator blade angle changes, caused several engine failures on takeoff. It was discovered that large and sudden temperature changes (e.g., from being parked in the sun prior to becoming airborne) were falsely causing the engine stator blades to close and choke the compressor. The dangers presented by these engine failures were compounded by the downward ejection seat, which gave the pilot little chance of a safe exit at low level. The engine systems were subsequently modified and the ejection seat changed to the more conventional upward type.

Uncontrolled oscillations of its wingtip-mounted fuel tank sheared one wing off of an F-104B; this problem was apparent during testing of the XF-104 prototype and was eventually resolved by filling the tank compartments in a specific order.

Early F-104s also lacked modulated afterburning, and as a result combat operations could only be performed at one of only two settings – either maximum military power or full afterburner. Effectively this gave the pilot the choice of two level-flight speeds: Mach 1 or Mach 2.2.

=== Later problems ===
A further engine problem was that of uncommanded opening of the variable-thrust nozzle (usually through loss of engine oil pressure, as the nozzles were actuated using engine oil as hydraulic fluid); although the engine would be running normally at high power, the opening of the nozzle resulted in a drastic loss of thrust to below that required to maintain level flight. At low altitudes this was unrecoverable, and it caused the loss of at least seven F-104s during testing. A modification program installed a manual nozzle closure control that reduced the problem, but according to designer Kelly Johnson, this took nine years to resolve satisfactorily.

The engine also suffered from afterburner blowout on takeoff, or even non-ignition, resulting in a major loss of thrust that could be detected by the pilot—the recommended action was to abandon the takeoff. The first fatal accident in German service was caused by this phenomenon. Some pilots experienced uncommanded "stick kicker" activation at low altitudes while flying straight and level, so F-104 crews were often directed to deactivate it for flight operations. Asymmetric or "split" flap deployment was another frequent cause of accidents. Many pilots also experienced severe nose wheel "shimmy" on landing, which usually resulted in the aircraft leaving the runway and in some cases even flipping over onto its back.

=== West German service ===
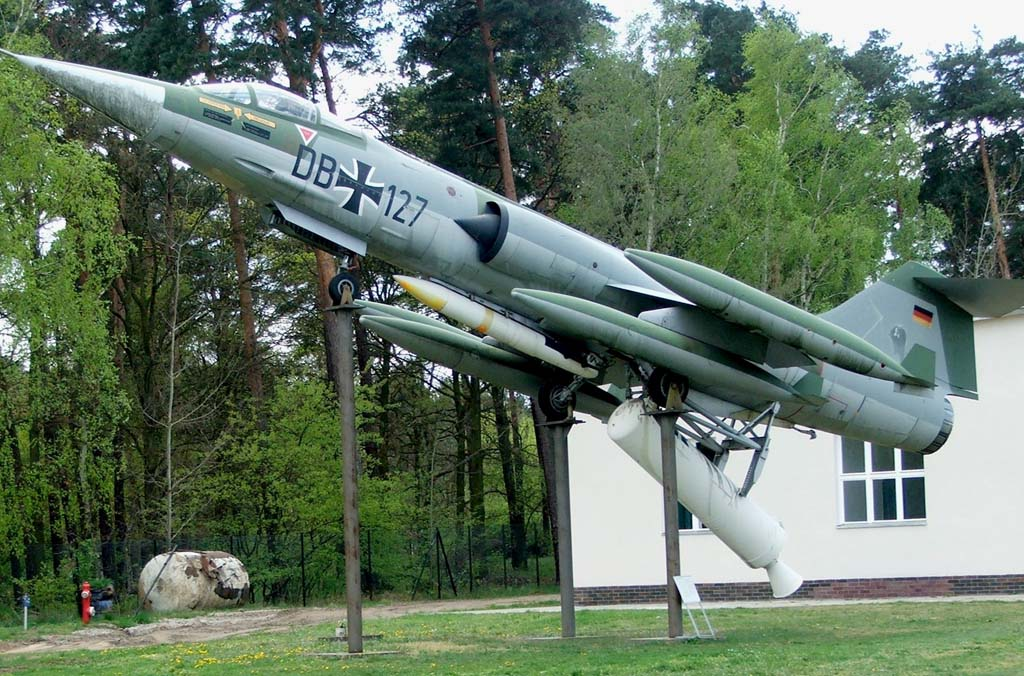
West German F-104G with a zero-length launch rocket booster and a replica B43 nuclear bomb at Militärhistorisches Museum Flugplatz Berlin-Gatow

The introduction of a highly technical aircraft type to a newly reformed air force was fraught with problems. Many pilots and ground crew had settled into civilian jobs after World War II and had not kept pace with developments, with pilots being sent on short "refresher" courses in slow and benign-handling first-generation jet aircraft. Ground crew were similarly employed with minimal training and experience, which was one consequence of a conscripted military with high turnover of service personnel. Operating in the poor weather conditions of northwest Europe (unlike the fair weather training conditions at Luke AFB in Arizona) and flying low at high speed over hilly terrain, many accidents were attributed to controlled flight into terrain (CFIT). A total of 116 pilots were lost in West German F-104 accidents, including 1 ground-crew passenger and 8 USAF instructors.

One contributing factor to this was the operational assignment of the F-104 in West German service: it was mainly used as a low-level fighter-bomber, as opposed to the original design of a high-speed, high-altitude fighter/interceptor. Furthermore, the installation of additional avionic equipment in the F-104G version, such as the inertial navigation system, added distraction for the pilot, as well as extra weight that further hampered the flying capabilities of the plane. In contemporary West German magazine articles highlighting the Starfighter safety problems, the aircraft was portrayed as "overburdened" with technology, which was considered a latent overstrain on the aircrews.

In 1966 Johannes Steinhoff took over command of the Luftwaffe and grounded the entire Luftwaffe and Bundesmarine F-104 fleet until he was satisfied that problems had been resolved or at least reduced. In later years, the safety record improved, although a new problem of structural failure of the wings emerged. Original fatigue calculations had not taken into account the high number of g-force loading cycles that the F-104 fleet was experiencing, and many airframes were returned to the depot for wing replacement or outright retirement. Towards the end of Luftwaffe service, some aircraft were modified to carry a flight data recorder or "black box", which could give an indication of the probable cause of an accident.

Erich Hartmann, the world's top-scoring fighter ace, commanded one of West Germany's first post-war jet-fighter-equipped wings and deemed the F-104 to be an unsafe aircraft with poor handling characteristics for aerial combat. In Navy service it lacked the safety margin of a twin-engine design such as the Blackburn Buccaneer. To the dismay of his superiors, Hartmann judged the fighter unfit for Luftwaffe use even before its introduction.

Eric Brown described the Starfighter as a hot ship, that "has to be flown every inch of the way". The USAF required Starfighter pilots to have at least 1,500 flight hours of experience prior to flying the F-104. West German pilots had around 400 hours. Brown recommended the Blackburn Buccaneer instead.

=== Normal operating hazards ===
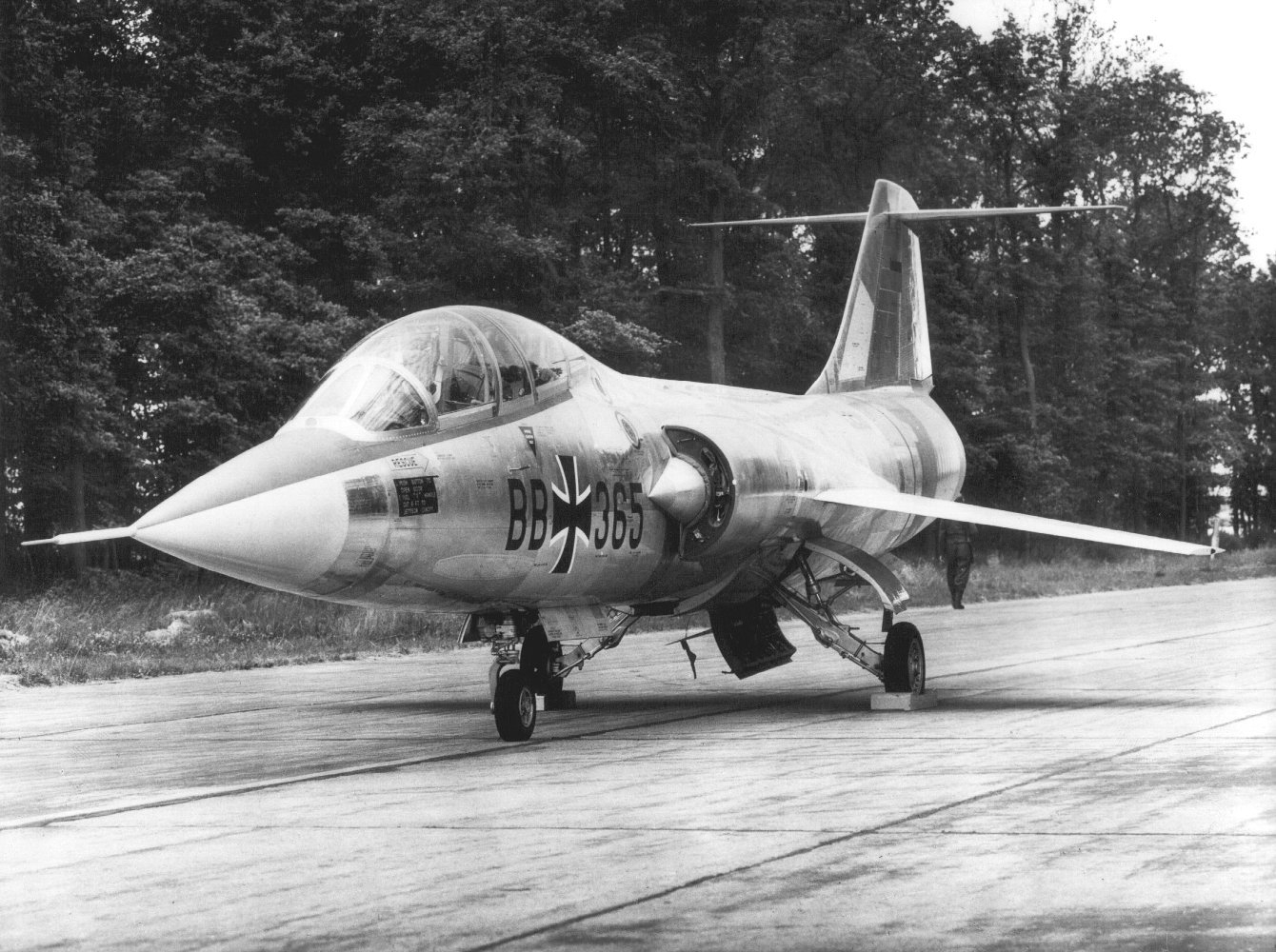
A West German F-104F in 1960. In 1962 this aircraft crashed along with three others after a pilot error.

The causes of a large number of aircraft losses were the same as for any other similar type. They included: bird strikes and other foreign object damage (particularly to the engine), lightning strikes, pilot spatial disorientation, and mid-air collisions with other aircraft. One such accident occurred on 19 June 1962 when a formation of four F-104F aircraft, practicing for the type's introduction-into-service ceremony the following day, crashed together after descending through a cloud bank. The pilot of the lead aircraft lost spatial orientation and was at too steep a nose-down angle to recover. Three German pilots and one American pilot were killed, and the four aircraft destroyed. As a result, formation aerobatic teams were immediately banned by the Luftwaffe.

=== Safety record ===
The safety record of the F-104 Starfighter became high-profile news in the mid-1960s, especially in West Germany. West Germany initially ordered 309 F-104s, and over time another 607. Deliveries of Lockheed-built aircraft started in August 1961, and domestically produced airframes began to roll off the assembly lines in December. That same month, the first of an eventual total of 292 West German F-104s had crashed. In October 1975, Lockheed agreed to pay a total of 3 million Deutsche Marks (US$1.2 million) to approximately 60 widows and dependents of 32 Luftwaffe pilots killed during flight operations, though the company declined to admit liability. While announcing the settlement, the plaintiffs' attorney acknowledged he had been seeking US$10 million and noted that there were more instances of pilot error than he had expected.

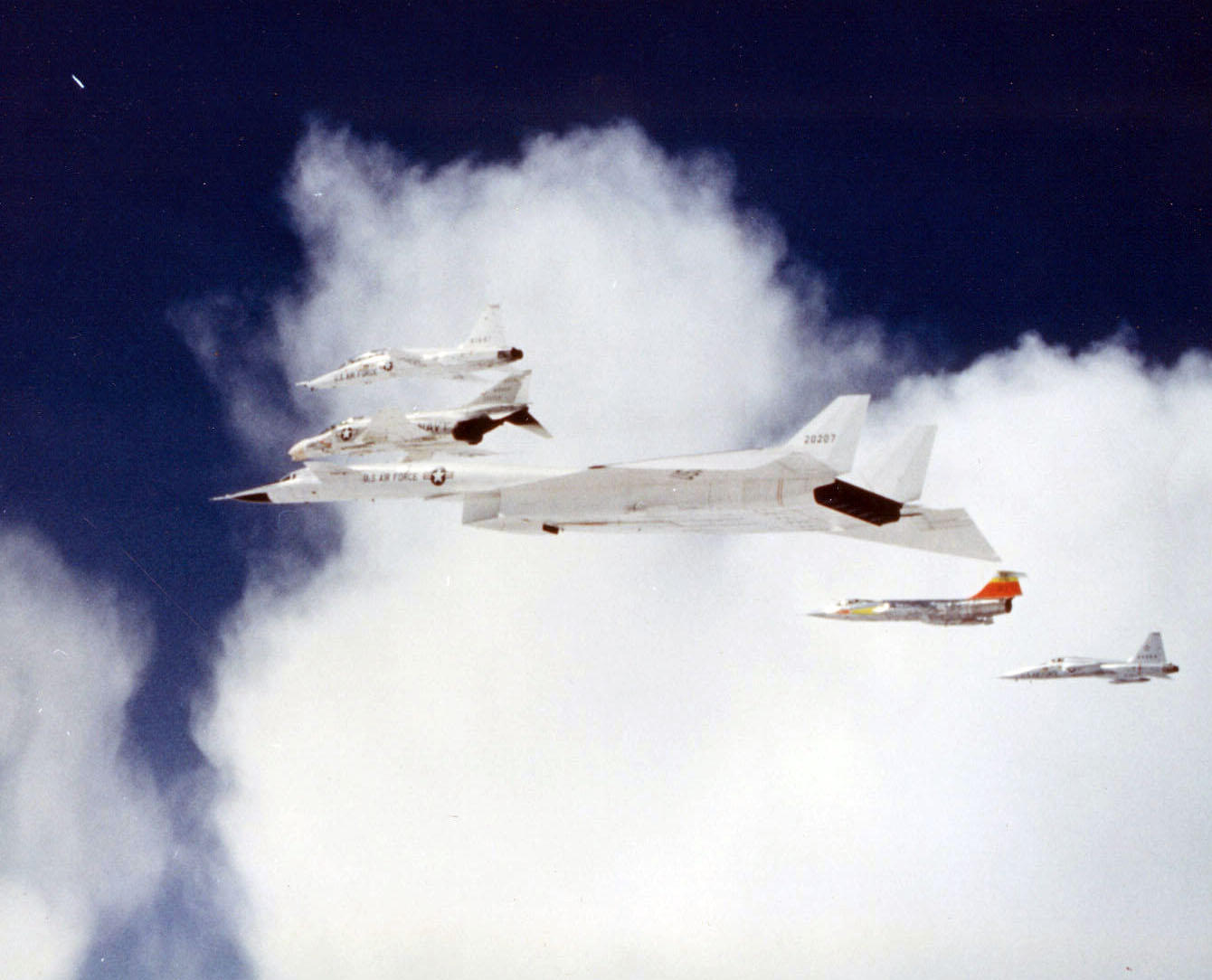
The second XB-70 Valkyrie prototype flies in formation with other GE-powered aircraft for a photo shoot, 8 June 1966. Shortly after this photograph was taken the F‑104 (red tail, on the XB‑70's right) and XB‑70 collided, killing the F‑104 pilot Joe Walker and the co‑pilot of the XB‑70.

Some operators lost a large proportion of their aircraft through accidents, although the accident rate varied widely depending on the user and operating conditions. The German Air Force and Federal German Navy, the largest combined user of the F-104 and operator of over 35% of all airframes built, lost approximately 32% of its Starfighters in accidents over the aircraft's 31-year career. The Belgian Air Force, on the other hand, lost 41 of its 100 airframes between February 1963 and September 1983, and Italy, the final Starfighter operator, lost 138 of 368 (37%) by 1992. Canada's accident rate with the F-104 ultimately exceeded 46% (110 of 238) over its 25-year service history, though the Canadian jets tended to be flown for a greater number of hours than those of other air forces (three times that of the German F-104s, for example). However, some operators had substantially lower accident rates: Denmark's attrition rate for the F-104 was 24%, with Japan losing just 15% and Norway 14% (6 of 43) of their respective Starfighter fleets. The best accident rate was achieved by the Spanish Air Force, which ended its Starfighter era with a perfect safety record: the Ejército del Aire lost none of its 18 F-104Gs and 3 TF-104Gs over a total of seven years and 17,500 flight hours.

The cumulative destroyed rate of the F-104 Starfighter in USAF service as of 31 December 1983 was 25.2 aircraft destroyed per 100,000 flight hours. This is the highest accident rate of any of the USAF Century Series fighters. By comparison, the cumulative destroyed rates for the other Century Series aircraft in USAF service over the same time period were 16.2 for the North American F-100 Super Sabre, 9.7 for the McDonnell F-101 Voodoo, 15.6 for the Republic F-105 Thunderchief, and 7.3 for the Convair F-106 Delta Dart. By comparison, the Royal Australian Air Force (RAAF) experienced an overall loss rate of 11.96 per 100,000 flying hours with the Dassault Mirage III, losing 40 of 116 aircraft to accidents over its 25-year career from 1965 to 1989. The Royal Air Force lost over 50 of 280 English Electric Lightnings, at one point experiencing 12 losses in the 17 months between January 1970 and May 1971; the loss rate per 100,000 hours from the introduction of the Lightning in 1961 to May 1971 was 17.3, higher than the lifetime West German Starfighter loss rate of 15.08.

Notable USAF pilots who died in F-104 accidents include Major Robert H. Lawrence Jr. and Captain Iven Kincheloe. Civilian (former USAAF) pilot Joe Walker died in a midair collision with an XB-70 Valkyrie while flying an F-104. Chuck Yeager was nearly killed in December 1963 when he lost control of an NF-104A during a high-altitude record-breaking attempt; he lost the tips of two fingers and was hospitalized for a long period with severe burns after ejecting from the aircraft.

== Variants ==
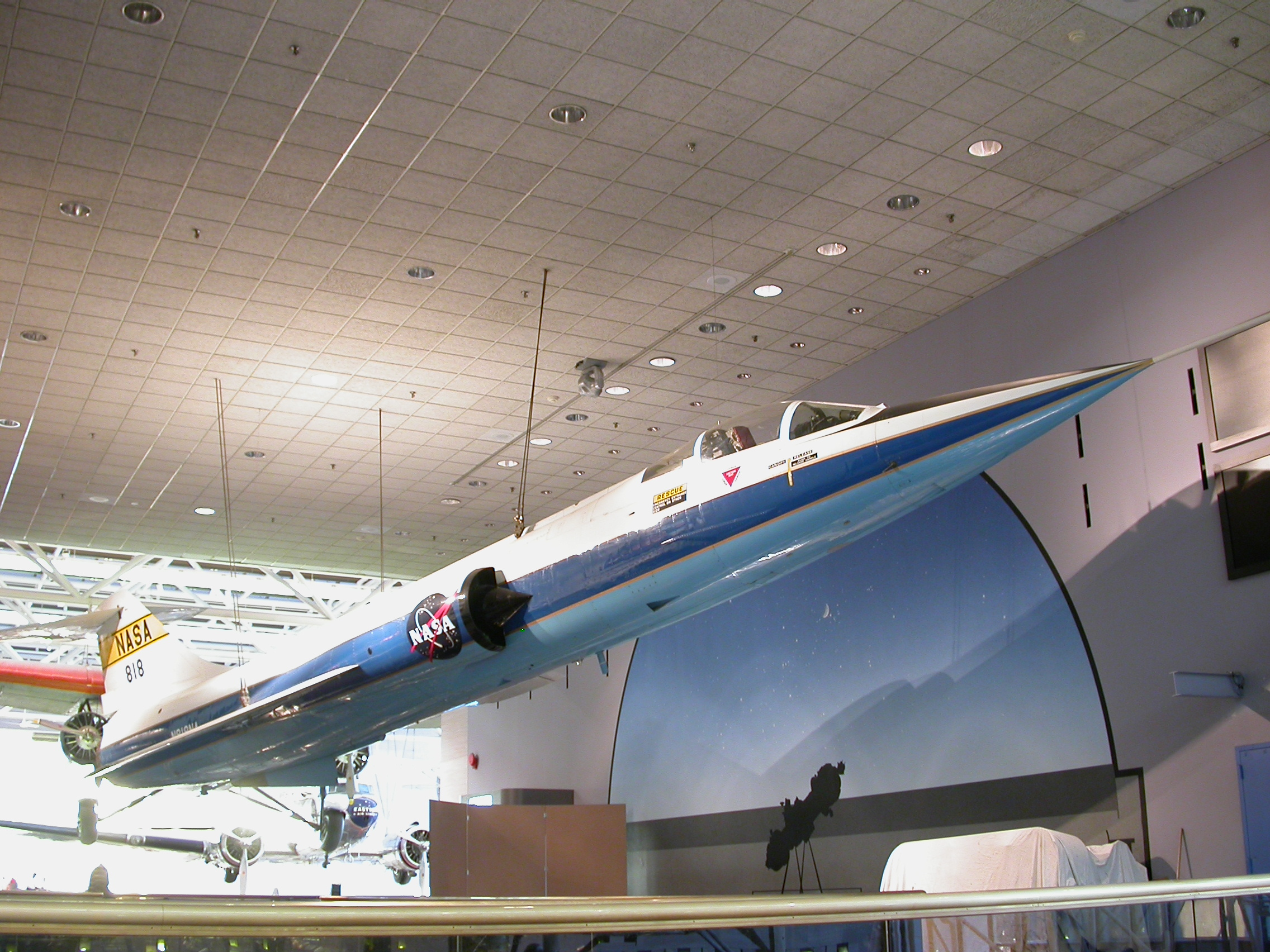
YF-104A, AF serial number 55-2961, NASA aircraft number 818, flown by NASA from 27 August 1956 to 26 August 1975, 1,439 flights

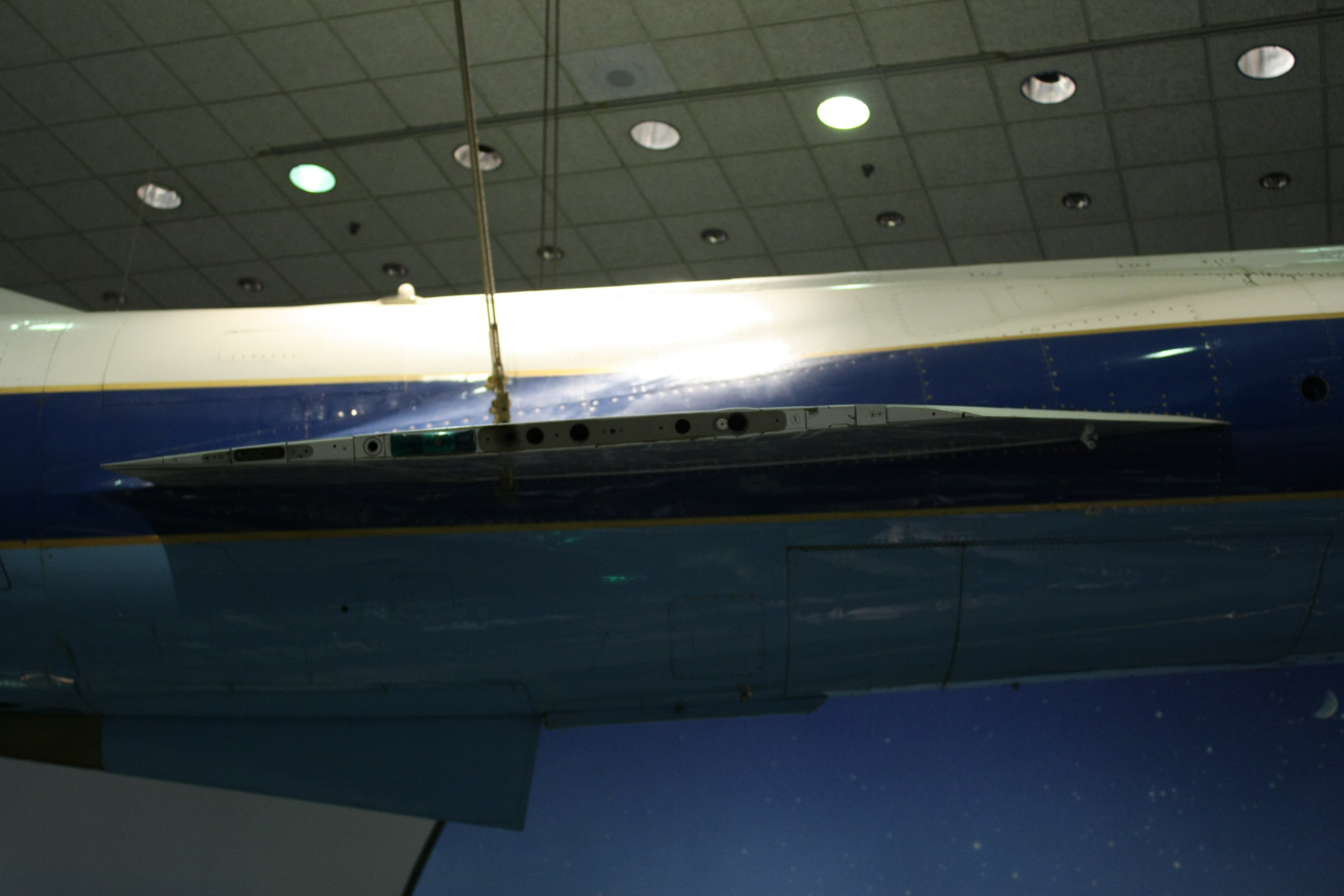
Side view of NASA YF-104A showing thinness of wing and sharpness of leading edge

XF-104
This was the prototype aircraft; two examples were built and powered by Wright J65 engines (the J79 was not yet ready). The second prototype was equipped with the M61 cannon as an armament test bed. Both aircraft were destroyed in crashes.
YF-104A
The YF-104A was a pre-production aircraft used for engine, equipment, and flight testing; 17 were built, with the first flight taking place on 17 February 1956 and reaching Mach 2 for the first time on 27 April.
F-104A
This aircraft was the initial production single-seat interceptor version, very similar to the YF-104A. A total of 153 were built. The F-104A was in USAF service from 1958 through 1960, then transferred to the Air National Guard until 1963. At that time they were recalled by the USAF Air Defense Command for the 319th and 331st Fighter Interceptor Squadrons. Some were released for export to Jordan, Pakistan, and Taiwan, each of which used it in combat. The 319th F-104As and Bs had their engines replaced in 1967 with the J79-GE-19, which provided 17,900 lbf (79.6 kN) of thrust in afterburner; the service ceiling with this engine was in excess of 73,000 ft (22,000 m). In 1969, all the F-104A/Bs in ADC service were retired. On 16 May 1958, an F-104A flown by USAF Captain Walter W. Irwin set a world flight airspeed record of 1,404.012 mph (2,259.538 km/h).
NF-104A
The NF-104A was used for three demilitarized versions with an additional 6,000 lbf (27 kN) Rocketdyne LR121/AR-2-NA-1 rocket engine, used for astronaut training at altitudes up to 120,800 ft (36,800 m).
QF-104A
A total of 24 F-104As (4 YF-104As, 20 early F-104As) were converted into radio-controlled drones and test aircraft. These target drones were able to be flown by onboard pilots as well as remotely controlled by pilots using radio-control equipment either on the ground or flying in other aircraft.
F-104B
The F-104B was a tandem two-seat, dual-control trainer version of the F-104A. A total of 26 built, the F-104B had an enlarged rudder and ventral fin, no cannon, and reduced internal fuel, but was otherwise combat-capable. A few were supplied to Jordan, Pakistan, and Taiwan.

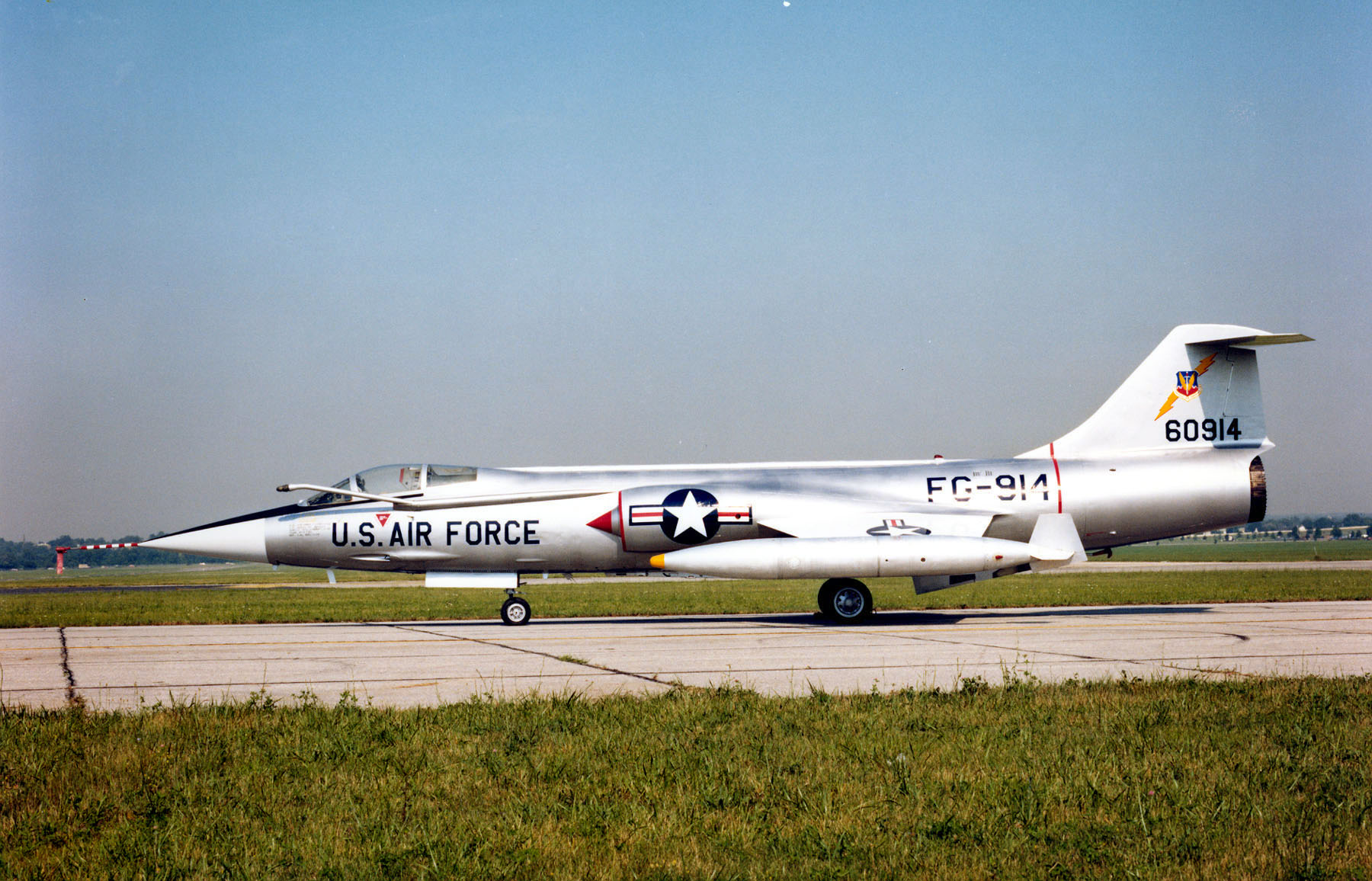
F-104C at the National Museum of the United States Air Force, Wright-Patterson AFB, Ohio

F-104C
A fighter-bomber for USAF Tactical Air Command, the F-104C had improved fire-control radar (AN/ASG-14T-2), one centerline and two pylons under each wing (for a total of five), and the ability to carry one Mk 28 or Mk 43 nuclear weapon on the centerline pylon. The F-104C also had in-flight refueling capability. Seventy-seven F-104Cs were built. On 14 December 1959, an F-104C set a world altitude record of 103,389 ft (31,513 m).
F-104D
The F-104D designation was a dual-control trainer version of the F-104C. Twenty-one examples were built.
F-104DJ
This aircraft was a dual-control trainer version of the F-104J for the Japanese Air Self-Defense Force (JASDF). Lockheed built 20 F-104DJs, assembling the first at their Burbank facility, and shipping the remaining 19 to Japan for assembly by Mitsubishi and Kawasaki. After their retirement in Japan, the United States delivered some these F-104J/DJs to the Taiwanese Air Force.
F-104F
The F-104F designation was given to a dual-control trainer based on the F-104D, but using the upgraded engine of the F-104G. It had no radar, and was not combat-capable. The F-104F was produced as an interim trainer for the German Air Force. All 30 F-104F aircraft were retired by 1972.

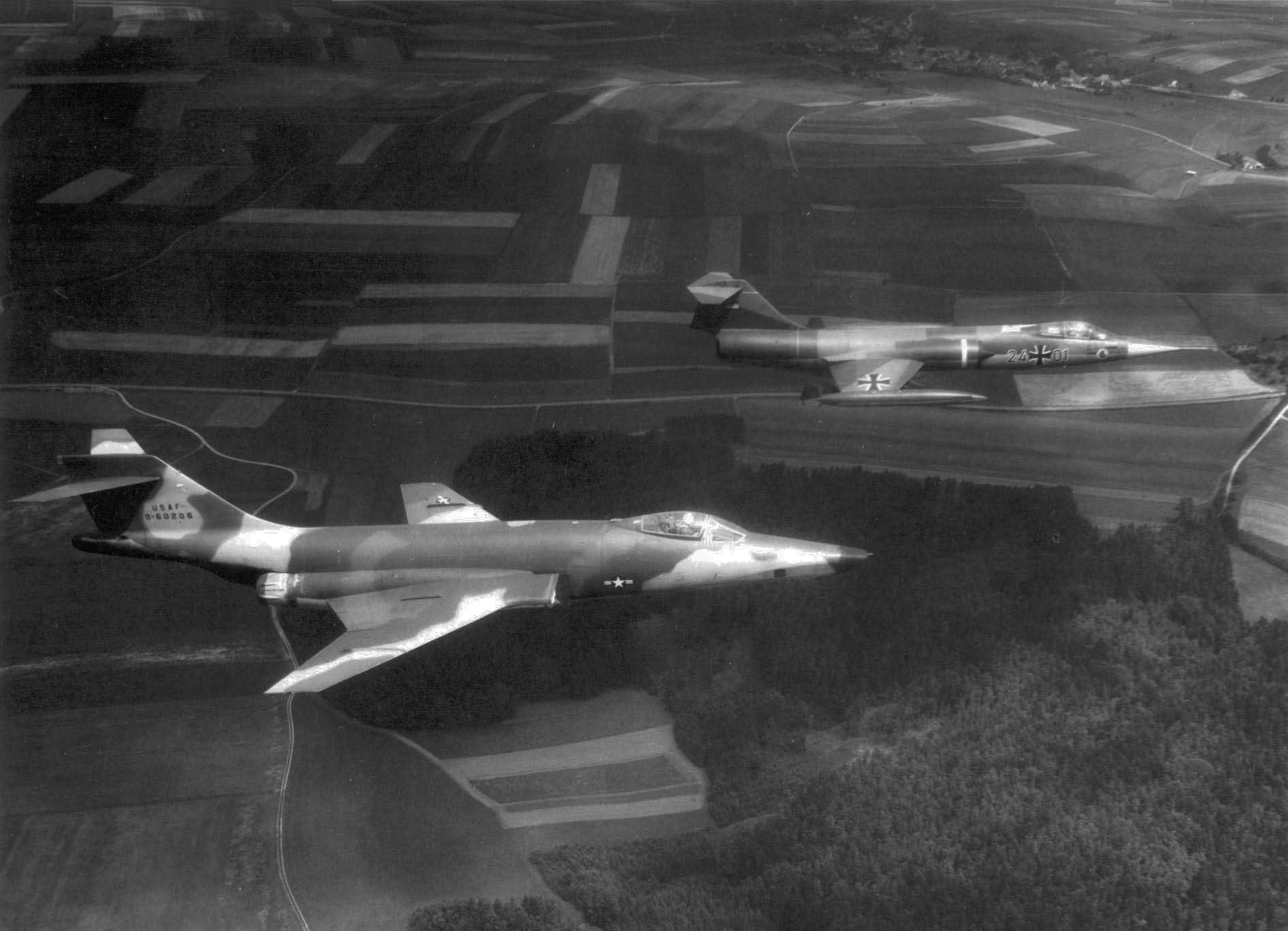
A German RF-104G in flight with a 66th TRW RF-101C

F-104G
The F-104G was the most-produced version of the F-104 family, a multi-role fighter-bomber with a total of 1,127 aircraft built. They were manufactured by Lockheed, as well as under license by Canadair and a consortium of European companies that included Messerschmitt/MBB, Fiat, Fokker, and SABCA. The type featured a strengthened fuselage, wing, and empennage structures; the larger vertical fin with fully powered rudder as used on the two-seat versions; fully powered brakes, a new anti-skid system, and larger tires; revised flaps for improved combat maneuvering; and a larger braking chute. Upgraded avionics included the Autonetics NASARR F15A-41B radar with air-to-air, ground-mapping, contour-mapping, and terrain-avoidance modes, as well as the Litton LN-3 inertial navigation system (the first on a production fighter).

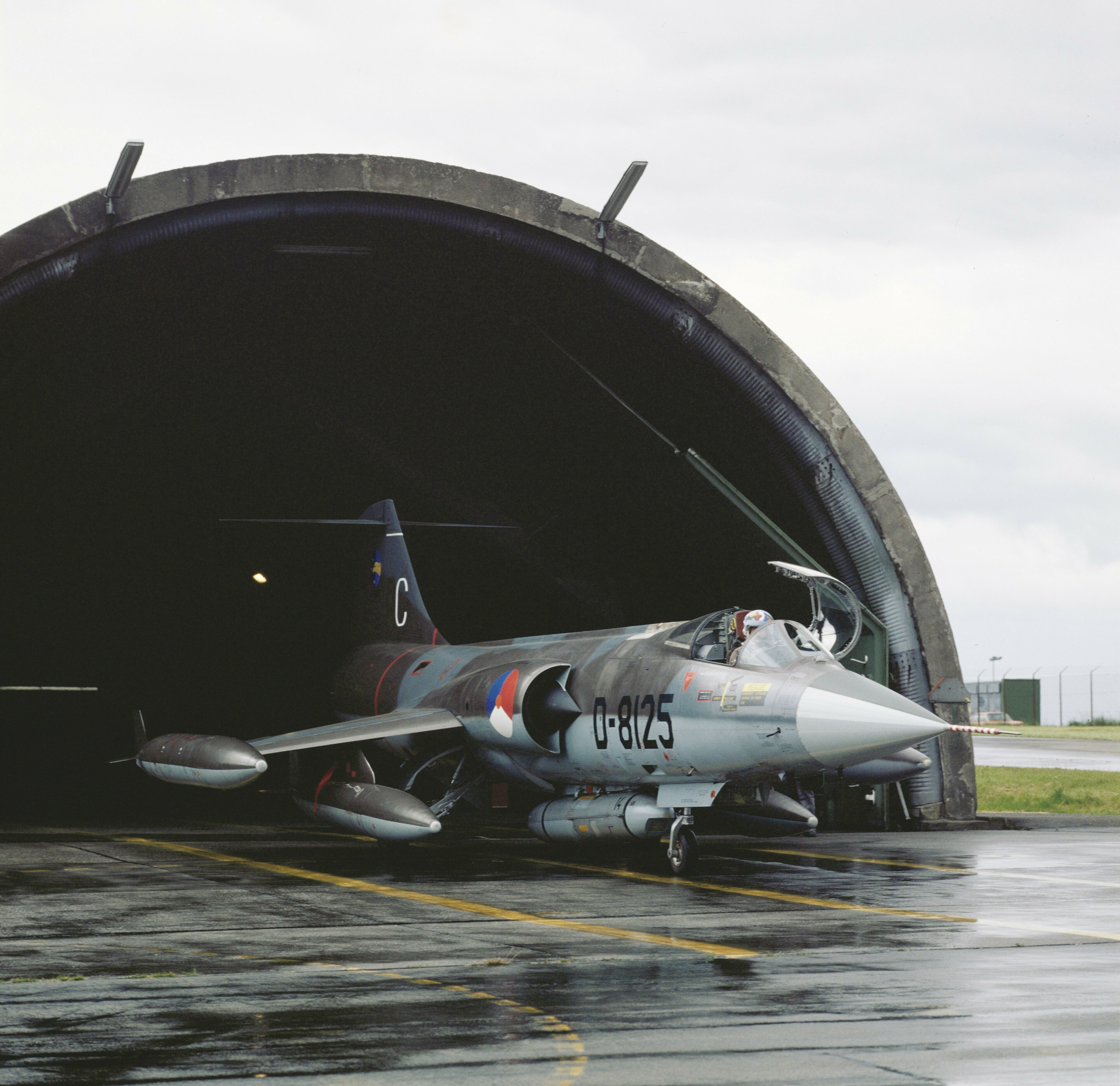
Dutch RF-104G equipped with Orpheus pod.

RF-104G
The RF-104G was a tactical reconnaissance model based on the F-104G, usually with three KS-67A cameras mounted in the forward fuselage in place of the internal cannon. Many of the 189 built were subsequently reconfigured to the F-104G standard.
TF-104G
A combat-capable trainer version of the F-104G, the TF-104G had no cannon or centerline pylon, and reduced internal fuel. One of the 220 aircraft produced was used by Lockheed as a demonstrator with the civil registration number N104L, and was flown by Jackie Cochran to set three women's world speed records in 1964. This aircraft later served in the Netherlands. A pair of two-seat TF-104Gs joined the NASA Dryden inventory in July 1975 along with a Fokker-built former RF-104G.

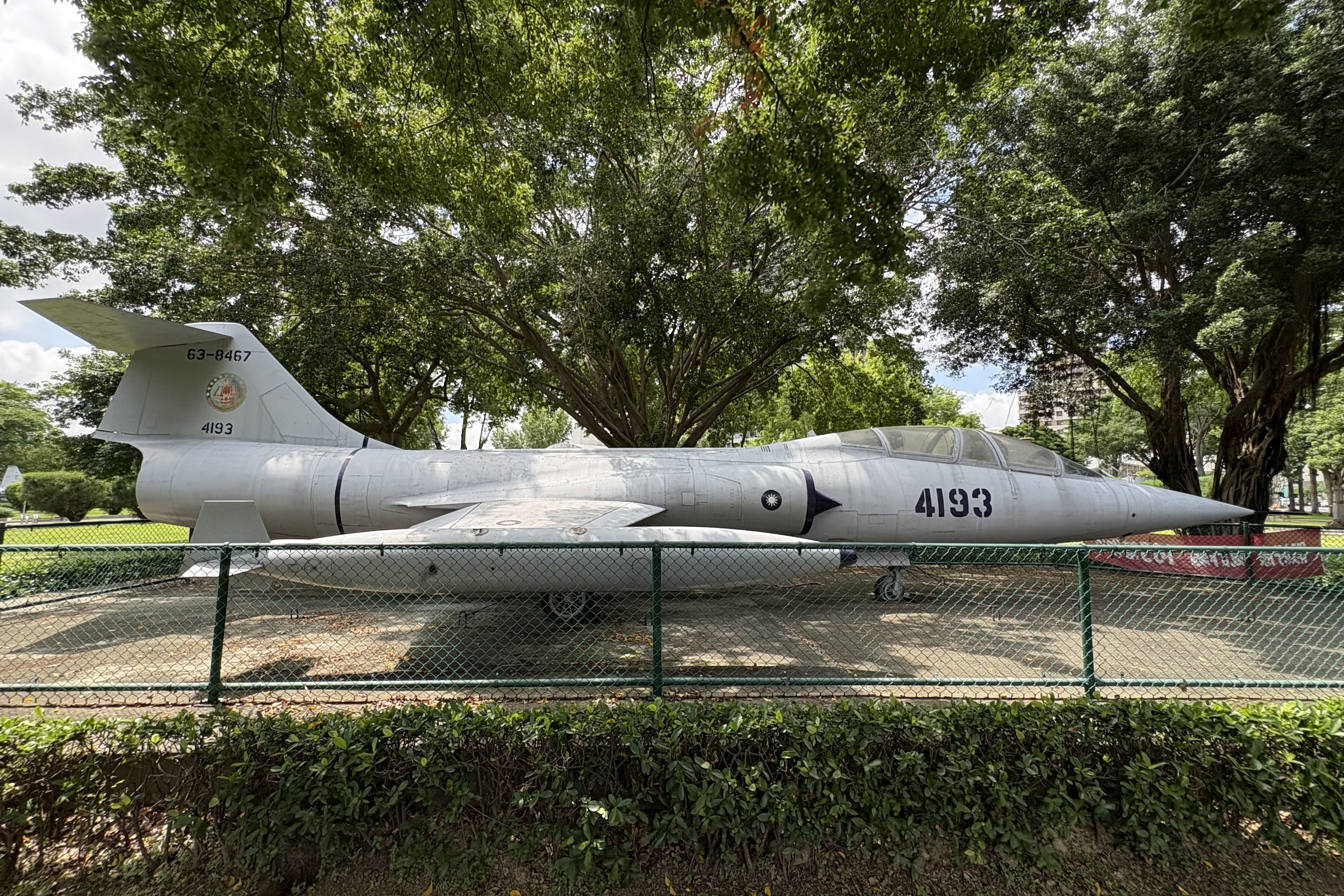
TF-104G 63-8467 in Taichung, Taiwan

F-104H
The F-104H was a projected export version based on the F-104G with an optical gunsight and simplified equipment. It was canceled prior to construction.
F-104J
The F-104J was a specialized interceptor version of the F-104G for the Japanese ASDF, built under license by Mitsubishi for the air-superiority role; it was armed with cannon and four Sidewinders, but had no strike capability. Some were converted to UF-104J radio-controlled target drones and destroyed. A total of 210 were built, three by Lockheed, 29 by Mitsubishi from Lockheed-sourced components, and 178 by Mitsubishi. After being retired in Japan, the U.S. delivered some of these 104J/DJs to the air force of Taiwan.
F-104N
Three unarmed and lighter F-104Gs were delivered to NASA in 1963 for use as high-speed chase aircraft and given the designation F-104N. One, piloted by Joe Walker, collided with an XB-70 on 8 June 1966.

Italian Air Force F-104S in original camouflage scheme with AIM-7 Sparrow missiles mounted under the wings, c. 1969

F-104S
FIAT built 246 of the final production version, the F-104S (one of these aircraft crashed prior to delivery and is often not included in the total number produced). Forty of these aircraft were delivered to the Turkish Air Force and the rest to the Italian Air Force (Aeronautica Militare Italiana). The F-104S was upgraded for the interception role, adding the NASARR R-21G/H radar with moving-target indicator and continuous-wave illuminator for semi-active radar homing missiles (initially the AIM-7 Sparrow), two additional wing and two underbelly hardpoints (increasing the total to nine), the more powerful J79-GE-19 engine, and two additional ventral fins to increase stability. The M61 cannon was sacrificed to make room for the missile avionics in the interceptor version, but was retained for the fighter-bomber variant. Typically two Sparrow and two (and sometimes four or six) Sidewinder missiles were carried on all the hardpoints except the central (underbelly), or up to seven 750 lb (340 kg) bombs (normally two to four 500–750 lb [230–340 kg] bombs). The F-104S was cleared for a higher maximum takeoff weight, allowing it to carry up to 7,500 lb (3,400 kg) of stores; other Starfighters had a maximum external load of 4,000 lb (1,800 kg). Its combat radius was up to 775 mi (1,247 km) with four external fuel tanks.
F-104S-ASA (Aggiornamento Sistemi d'Arma – "Weapon Systems Update")
This was an upgraded F-104S equipped with the FIAR R21G/M1 radar with frequency hopping and a look-down/shoot-down capability, new IFF system and weapon delivery computer, and provision for the AIM-9L all-aspect Sidewinder and Selenia Aspide missiles. A total of 150 were built, with the first flight in 1985.
F-104S-ASA/M (Aggiornamento Sistemi d'Arma/Modificato – "Weapon Systems Update/Modified")
Forty-nine airframes were upgraded from 1995 to 1997 to ASA/M standard with GPS, new TACAN, and Litton LN-30A2 INS, a refurbished airframe, and improved cockpit displays. All strike-related equipment was removed. The last Starfighters in combat service, the F-104S-ASA/M was withdrawn in October 2004 and temporarily replaced by the F-16 Fighting Falcon, while awaiting Eurofighter Typhoon deliveries.
CF-104
CF-104 was the designation applied to 200 Canadian-built versions, built under license by Canadair. Optimized for nuclear strike, the CF-104 NASARR R-24A radar with air-to-air modes was removed and the cannon deleted (both were restored after 1972). It had an additional internal fuel cell, and a license-built Orenda Engines J79-OEL-7 turbojet with 10,000 lbf (44 kN)/15,800 lbf (70 kN) thrust.
CF-104D
The CF-104D was a dual-control trainer version of the CF-104, built by Lockheed, but with Canadian J79-OEL-7 engines. Thirty-eight were built, with some later being transferred to Denmark, Norway, and Turkey.

== Production summary table and costs ==
Production summary
Type	Lockheed	Multi- national	Canadair	Fiat	Fokker	MBB (Note: Messerschmitt later merged into Messerschmitt-Bölkow-Blohm (MBB), eventually part of EADS.)	Messer- schmitt	Mitsubishi	SABCA	Total
XF-104	2									2
YF-104A	17									17
F-104A	153									153
F-104B	26									26
F-104C	77									77
F-104D	21									21
F-104DJ	20									20
CF-104			200							200
CF-104D	38									38
F-104F	30									30
F-104G	139		140	169	231	50	210		188 (Note: One aircraft crashed on test-flight and is not included.)	1127
RF-104G	40			30	119					189
TF-104G	172	48								220
F-104J	3							207		210
F-104N	3									3
F-104S				245						245
Total by manufacturer	741	48	340	444	350	50	210	207	188	2578

F-104 costs (US dollars, 1960)
	F-104A	F-104B	F-104C	F-104D	F-104G	TF-104G
Unit R&D cost			189,473	189,473		
Airframe	1,026,859	1,756,388	863,235	873,952		
Engine	624,727	336,015	473,729	271,148	169,000	
Electronics	3,419	13,258	5,219	16,210		
Armament	19,706	231,996	91,535	269,014		
Ordnance	29,517	59,473	44,684	70,067		
Flyaway cost	1,700,000	2,400,000	1,500,000	1,500,000	1,420,000	1,260,000
Modification costs by 1973			198,348	196,396		
Cost per flying hour	655					
Maintenance cost per flying hour	395	544	395	395		

== Operators ==
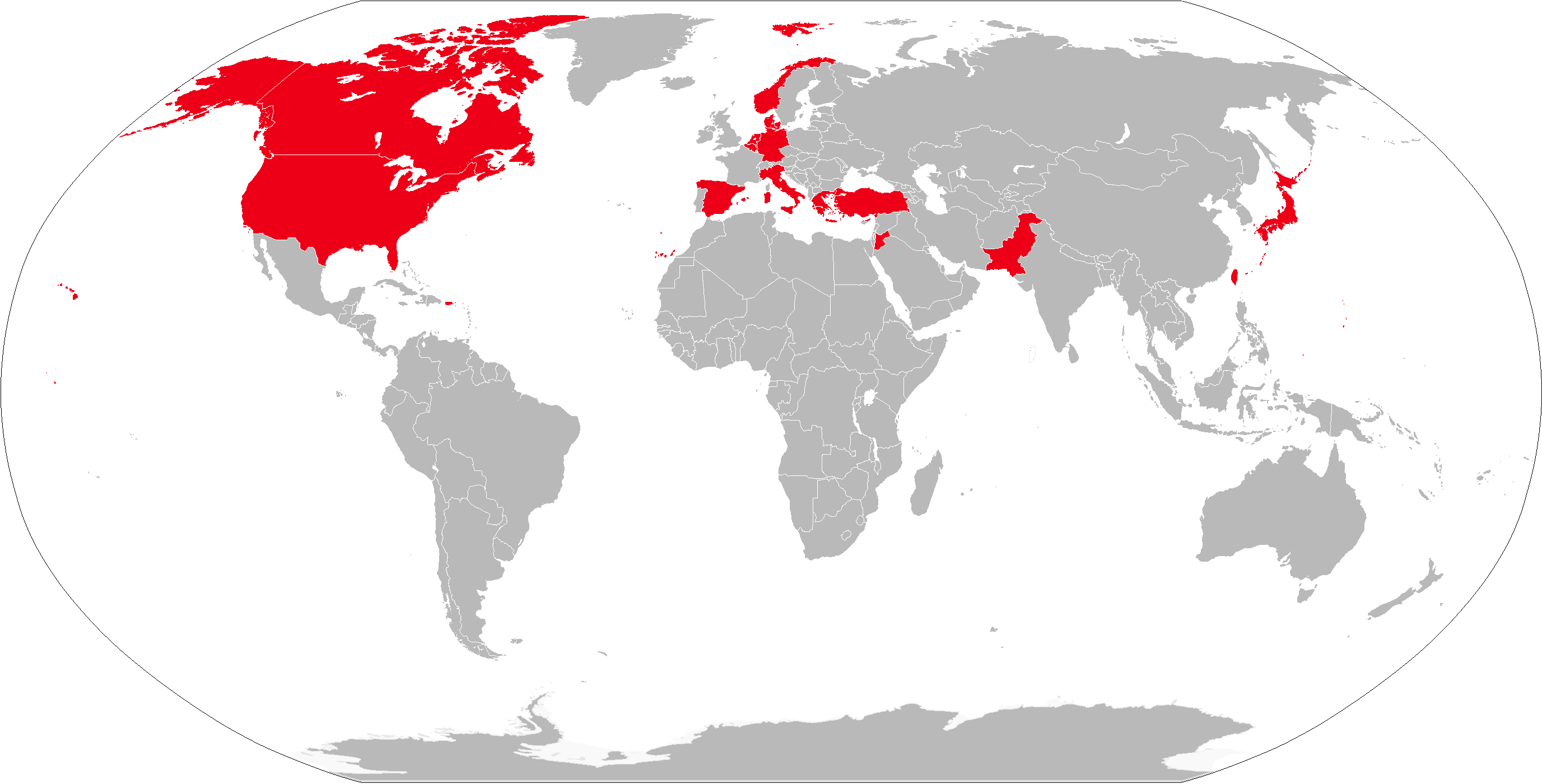
Former Lockheed F-104 Starfighter operators

The F-104 was operated by the militaries of the following nations:

- Belgium
- Canada
- Denmark
- Germany
- Greece
- Italy
- Japan
- Jordan
- Netherlands
- Norway
- Pakistan
- Spain
- Taiwan (Republic of China)
- Turkey
- United States

As of 2019, the FAA registry listed 12 privately owned F-104s in the United States. Starfighters Inc, a civilian demonstration team in Florida, operates several former Italian Air Force F-104 Starfighters. Another, 5303 (104633), civil registry N104JR, is owned and operated by a private collector in Arizona.

== Specifications (F-104G) ==
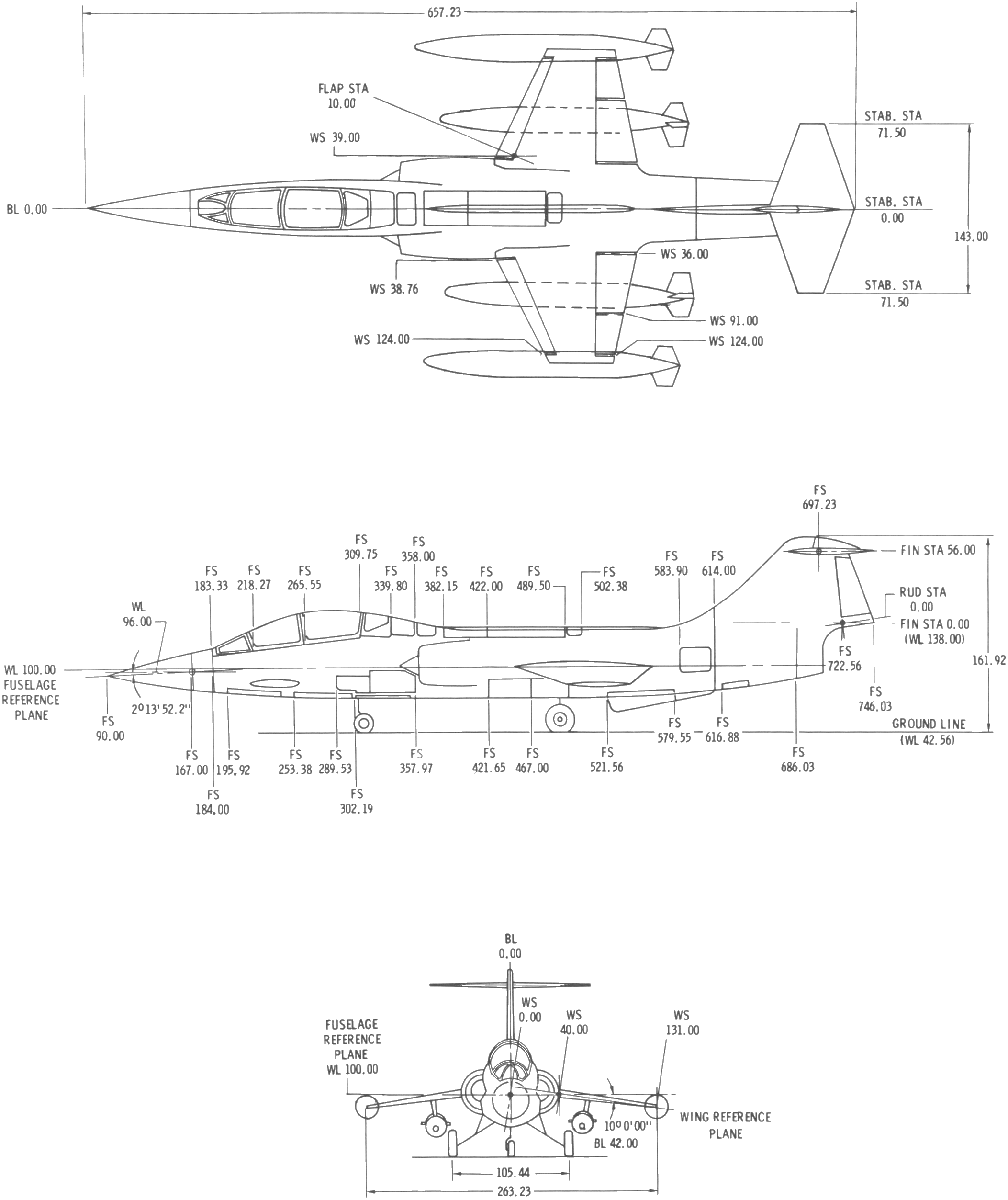
3-view line drawing of the Lockheed F-104B Starfighter.

External image
- Lockheed F-104 Starfighter Cutaway
- Lockheed F-104 Starfighter Cutaway from Flightglobal.com

Data from Quest for Performance (NASA)

General characteristics

- Crew: 1
- Length: 54 ft 8 in (16.66 m)
- Wingspan: 21 ft 9 in (6.63 m)
- Height: 13 ft 6 in (4.11 m)
- Wing area: 196.1 sq ft (18.22 m^{2})
- Airfoil: Biconvex 3.36% root and tip
- Empty weight: 14,000 lb (6,350 kg)
- Max takeoff weight: 29,027 lb (13,166 kg)
- Powerplant: 1 × General Electric J79 afterburning turbojet, 10,000 lbf (44 kN) thrust dry, 15,600 lbf (69 kN) with afterburner

Performance

- Maximum speed: 1,528 mph (2,459 km/h, 1,328 kn)
- Maximum speed: Mach 2
- Combat range: 420 mi (680 km, 360 nmi)
- Ferry range: 1,630 mi (2,620 km, 1,420 nmi)
- Service ceiling: 73,000 ft (22,000 m)
- Rate of climb: 48,000 ft/min (240 m/s) Initially
- Lift-to-drag: 9.2
- Wing loading: 105 lb/sq ft (510 kg/m^{2})
- Thrust/weight: 0.54 with max. takeoff weight (0.76 loaded)

Armament

- Guns: 1 × 20 mm (0.787 in) M61A1 Vulcan 6-barreled rotary cannon, 725 rounds
- Hardpoints: 7 with a capacity of 4,000 lb (1,800 kg), with provisions to carry combinations of:
  - Missiles: 4 × AIM-9 Sidewinder
  - Other: Bombs, rockets, or other stores

== See also ==
- Aircraft in fiction#F-104 Starfighter
- List of surviving Lockheed F-104 Starfighters
- North American Eagle Project

Related development

- Aeritalia F-104S Starfighter
- Canadair CF-104 Starfighter
- CL-1200 Lancer and X-27
- Lockheed NF-104A
- Lockheed XF-104 Starfighter
- Lockheed U-2

Aircraft of comparable role, configuration, and era

- Dassault Mirage III
- English Electric Lightning
- EWR VJ 101
- Mikoyan-Gurevich MiG-21
- Grumman F11F-1F Super Tiger
- Saunders-Roe SR.177
- Sukhoi Su-15

Related lists

- List of fighter aircraft
- List of military aircraft of the United States
