= List of surviving Lockheed F-104 Starfighters =

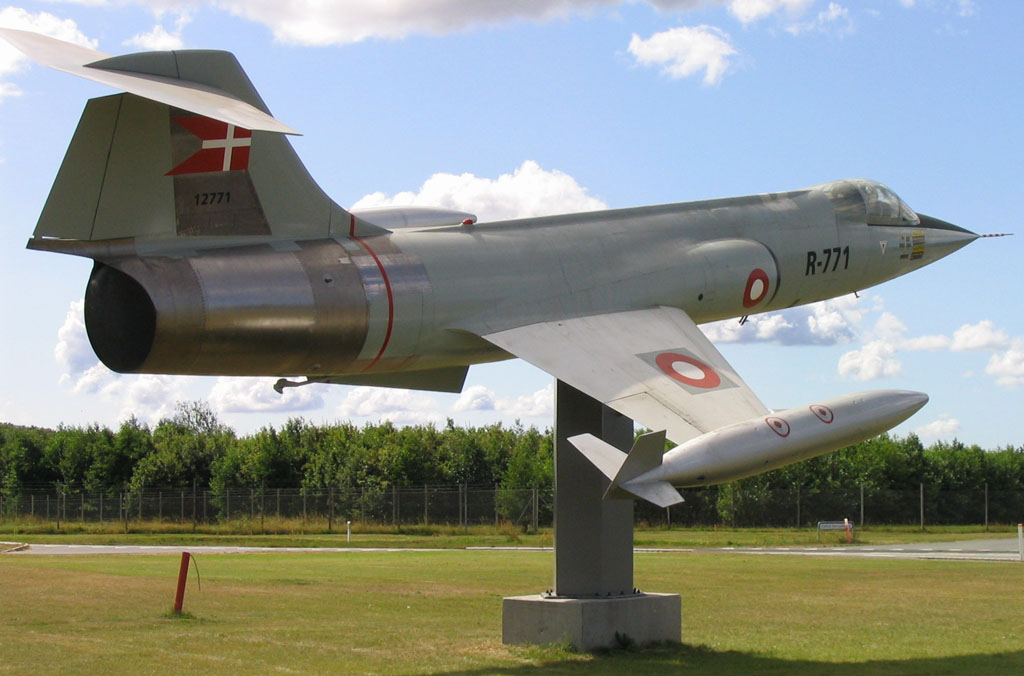
RDAF F-104G at Flyvestation Aalborg, Denmark

This is an incomplete list of known Lockheed F-104 Starfighter survivors. Please see the Canadair CF-104 Starfighter, Lockheed NF-104A and Aeritalia F-104S pages for their known survivors.

== Surviving aircraft ==
=== Belgium ===
F-104G

- 26+47 German Air Force – at company at Tessenderlo
- FX04 Belgian Air Force – 1st Wing Historical Center at Beauvechain Air Base
- FX12 Belgian Air Force – Royal Museum of the Armed Forces and Military History, Brussels
- FX15 Belgian Air Force – stored at the 1st Wing Historical Center at Beauvechain Air Base
- FX21 Belgian Air Force – Headquarters of the Belgian Air Force at Evere
- FX39 Belgian Air Force – stored with the 10th Tactical Wing at Kleine Brogel
- FX47 Belgian Air Force – 1st Wing Historical Center at Beauvechain Air Base
- FX53 Belgian Air Force – gate-guard at the Technical School of the Air Force, Saffraanberg near Sint-Truiden
- FX61 Belgian Air Force – stored with the 10th Tactical Wing at Kleine Brogel
- FX76 Belgian Air Force – stored at a factory next to the E40 Motorway at Zaventem
- FX79 Belgian Air Force – top of a sea container at a scrap dealer next to the E3 Motorway at Lochristi-Beervelde
- FX86 Belgian Air Force – front of the officers mess at the 10th Tactical Wing at Kleine Brogel
- FX94 Belgian Air Force – on a roundabout at the N73-Kiezel Kleine Brogel in front of the Belgian Kleine Brogel Air Base
- FX99 Belgian Air Force – the last Belgian Starfighter to fly was preserved/stored with International Vintage Aircraft at Markham, Ontario but was bought by Peter Mullens to be brought over to a location at Helchteren in Belgium.
- FX100 Belgian Air Force – stored in the same location as the FX76

=== Canada ===
F-104A

- 12700 Royal Canadian Air Force – on display at the Canada Aviation and Space Museum in Ottawa, Ontario

CF-104

- 12846 Royal Canadian Air Force – on display at the Air Force Museum of Alberta.
- 104-783 Royal Canadian Air Force squadron – on display at the Atlantic Canada Aviation Museum
- 104-646 Royal Canadian Air Force – on display at the National Air Force Museum of Canada

TF-104G

- D-5805 Royal Netherlands Air Force – Alberta Aviation Museum

=== Czech Republic ===
F-104G

- FX93 Belgian Air Force – Air Park Zruč

=== France ===
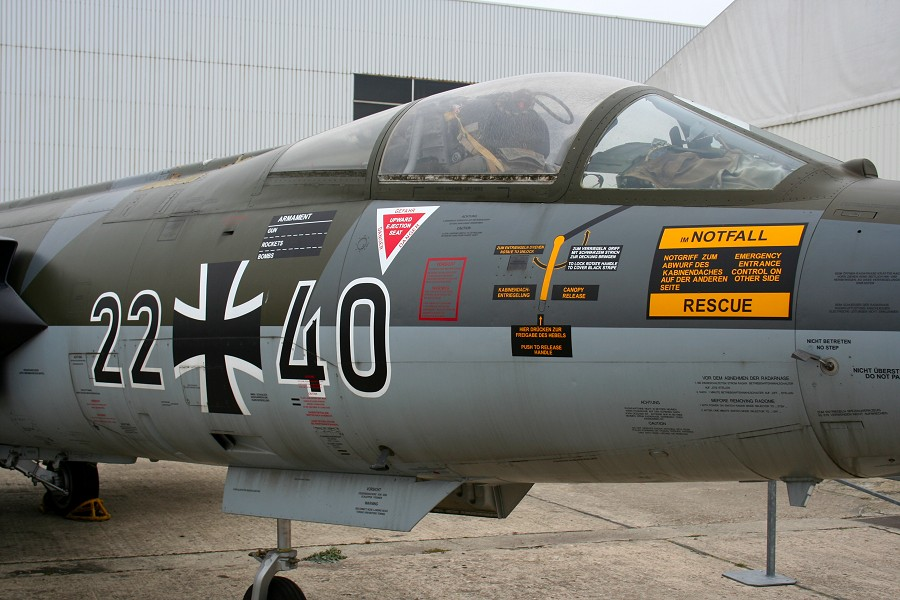
F-104G "22+40" at Le Bourget Museum, France

F-104G

- 22+40 German Air Force – Musée de l'Air et de l'Espace, Le Bourget Airport, Paris
- 21+91 German Air Force – Ailes Anciennes Toulouse
- 21+96 German Air Force – Musée de l'Épopée de l'industrie et de l'aéronautique, Albert
- FX90 Belgian Air Force – Savigny-lès-Beaune

TF-104G

- FC08 Belgian Air Force – Savigny-lès-Beaune

=== Germany ===
F-104F

- 29+03 – Deutsches Museum Flugwerft Schleissheim at Oberschleißheim in the northern suburbs of Munich

F-104G

- 20+07 – At a private collection in Freiberg
- 20+37 – Luftwaffenmuseum der Bundeswehr at Berlin-Gatow
- 20+43 – Flugausstellung Hermeskeil
- 20+45 – Aviation Museum Hannover-Laatzen at Hanover
- 20+59 - Universität der Bundeswehr München, Munich
- 20+81 (painted as 23+81) – at the air base in Schleswig, Schleswig-Holstein
- 21+55 - Flugplatz Haßfurt
- 21+53 – Deutsches Museum at Munich
- 21+56 – Luftfahrt- und Technik-Museumspark, Merseburg
- 22+06 - Unteroffiziersschule der Luftwaffe Appen, USLw
- 22+45 – Wernigerode
- 22+49 – Auto & Technik Museum Sinsheim, Sinsheim
- 22+58 – "Traditionsgemeinschaft JaboG-34", in Memmingen
- 23+09 – (Marineflieger) – Wernigerode
- 25+49 – Wernigerode (front fuselage only)
- 26+49 – Luftwaffenmuseum der Bundeswehr at Berlin-Gatow
- 26+53 – Gerhard Neumann Museum, Niederalteich
- 26+63 – Technik Museum Speyer, Speyer
- DB+127 ZLL – Luftwaffenmuseum der Bundeswehr at Berlin-Gatow
- FX60 – Belgian Air Force – preserved at the Flugausstellung Hermeskeil
- 21+69 – Nörvenich Air Base at Nörvenich
- 23+76 (painted as 22+90) German Air Force – at a small aircraft collection in Winterberg/Niedersfeld
- FX69 Belgian Air Force – fuselage stored at Weeze Airport

F-104G-CCV

- 98+36 – German Air Force – Wehrtechnische Studiensammlung Koblenz, Koblenz

TF-104G

- 27+90 – Luftwaffenmuseum der Bundeswehr at Berlin-Gatow
- 28+27 – Technik Museum Speyer, Speyer
- 29+06 – Luftwaffenmuseum der Bundeswehr at Berlin-Gatow

=== Greece ===
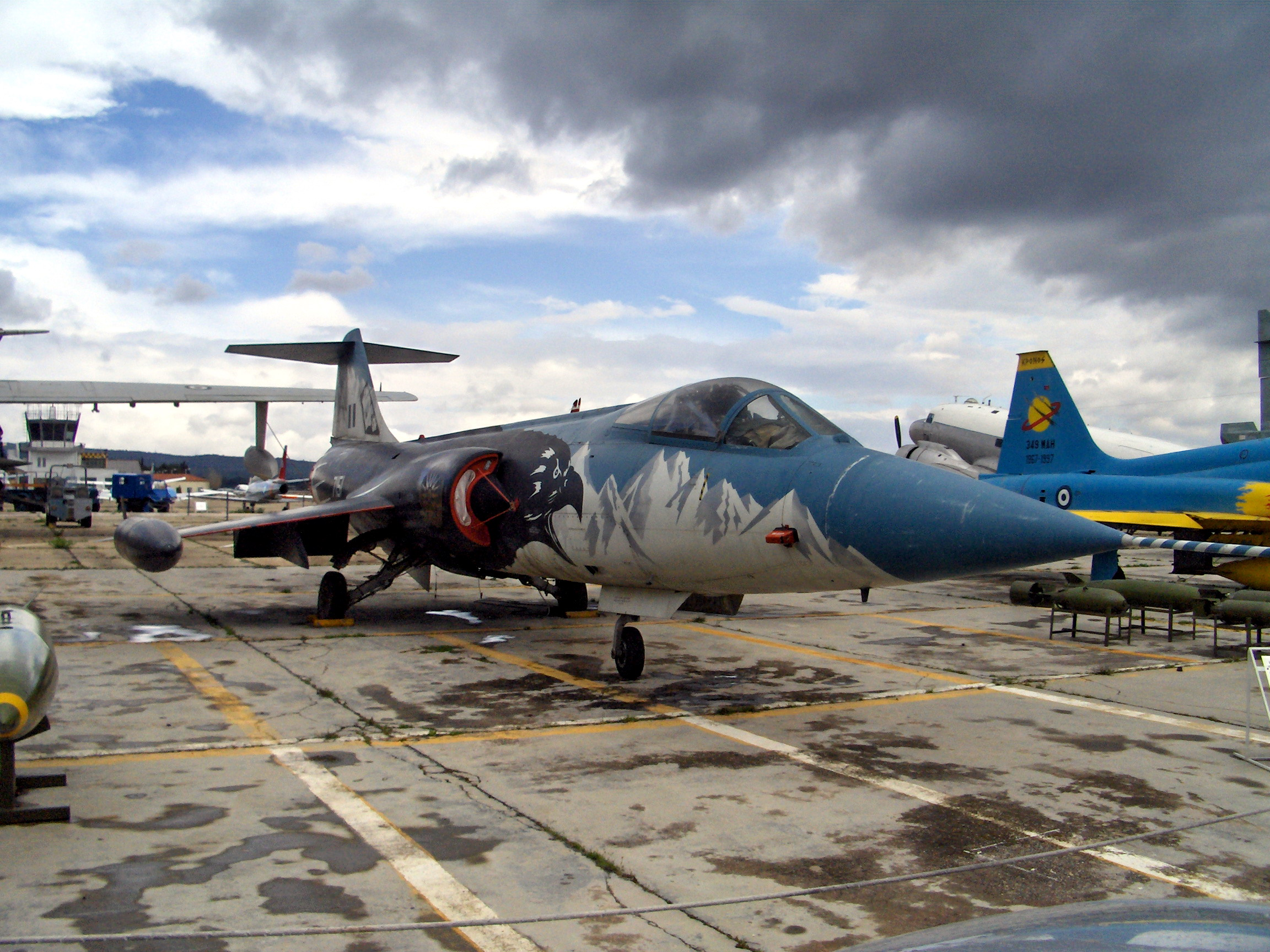
HAF F-104G (FG-7151) painted in "Olympus" anniversary scheme, March 2008

F-104G

- FG-426 Leuctra Village, Viotia, Monument of the Viotia AF Aviators Lost
- FX52 Belgian Air Force – Palis Foundation at Karelias Koropiou
- FG-695 Hellenic Air Force – Athens War Museum
- 32720/FG-720 Hellenic Air Force Museum, named "Tiger."
- FG-7151 Hellenic Air Force Museum, named "Olympus."
- FG-425 Tragano village central square, Ilia, next to 117 Combat Wing

=== Hungary ===
F-104G

- 21+64 German Air Force – Hungarian Museum of Hungarian Aviation, Szolnok

=== Italy ===
The Italian Air Force was a major user of F-104s, and the last air force to withdraw the aircraft from its front line. More than 100 F-104s are in display in Italy. A complete list is available here.

TF-104G

- MM54228 Italian Air Force – Turin Airport

F-104

- 3-01 Italian Air Force – Trento Airport

=== Japan ===
Over 51 F-104's are preserved across Japan. A complete list is available here.

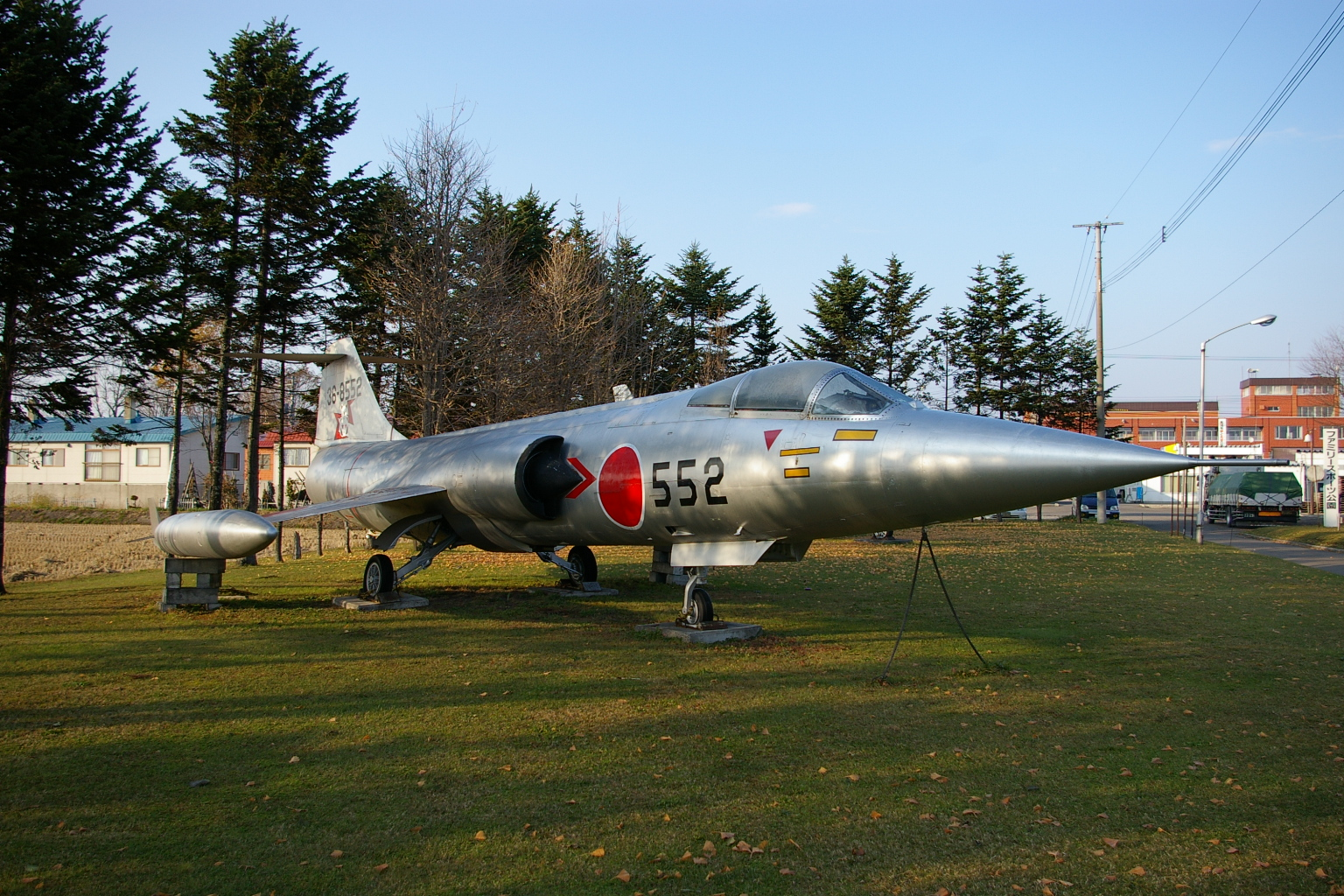
JASDF F-104J 36-8552in Chippubetsu, Hokkaido, November 2006

F-104J

- 26-5007 JASDF – Kawaguchiko Motor Museum, Narusawa, Yamanashi
- 36-8515 JASDF – Kakamigahara Aerospace Museum, Kakamigahara, Gifu
- 36-8552 JASDF – Family Spot Park in Chippubetsu, Hokkaido, near Hokkaido AFB
- 36-8687 JASDF – Top of a mountain in Okayama
- 56-8662 JASDF – Displayed at Fuchū Air Base, Tokyo
- 76-8688 JASDF – Naha Air Base
- 46-8574 JASDF – Gate guardian at Chitose Air Base
- 76-8706 JASDF – On the roof of the Hasegawa Corporation, at their headquarters in Yaizu, Shizuoka

=== Jordan ===
F-104A

- s/n unknown – Royal Jordanian Air Force – University of Jordan, Amman, known as the Muath al-Kasasbeh memorial.
- s/n unknown – Royal Jordanian Air Force – road between Ajloun and Andara, Ajloun Governorate

F-104B

- 902 – Royal Jordanian Air Force – Prince al Hassan St., Madaba

=== Netherlands ===
F-104G

- 21+73 German Air Force – for sale at PS Aero in Baarlo
- 22+90 German Air Force - Gate Guard at Aviodrome, Lelystad, painted in bright red
- 24+63 German Air Force – for sale at PS Aero in Baarlo, painted as 'D-8212' (Royal Netherlands Air Force)
- 26+02 German Air Force Schagen factory at Hasselt, Painted as 'D-8029'.
- 26+72 Marineflieger – for sale at PS Aero in Baarlo
- D-8022 Royal Netherlands Air Force – on display at Nationaal Militair Museum, Soesterberg
- D-8051 Royal Netherlands Air Force – on display at Leeuwarden Air Base
- D-8053 Royal Netherlands Air Force – on display at Air Operations Control Station Nieuw-Milligen
- D-8061 Royal Netherlands Air Force – on display at Aviodrome, Lelystad
- D-8114 Royal Netherlands Air Force – on Volkel Airbase, restoration for display during the Airforce days set on June 14 & 15 2019 Volkel Airbase
- D-8245 Royal Netherlands Air Force – gateguard at the Nationaal Militair Museum, Soesterberg
- D-8259 Royal Netherlands Air Force – on display at Regionaal Opleidings Centrum, Amsterdam Airport
- D-8279 Royal Netherlands Air Force – on display at Volkel Air Base
- D-8282 Royal Netherlands Air Force – on display at Sabadell Airport
- D-8318 Royal Netherlands Air Force – gateguard at Leeuwarden air base
- FX45 Belgian Air Force – gate guardian at Autosloperij Ad Stouten, Oosterland, Zeeland, painted as 'D-8030' Royal Netherlands Air Force
- KG-101 German Air Force – stored at PS Aero at Baarlo Has been sold to a private owner.

TF-104G

- D-5803 Royal Netherlands Air Force – stored with Nationaal Militair Museum
- D-5805 Royal Netherlands Air Force – stored with Nationaal Militair Museum
- D-5806 Royal Netherlands Air Force – stored with Nationaal Militair Museum

=== Norway ===
Airworthy

CF-104D

- 104637 – Bodø Main Air Station. Civilian registration LN-STF.

On display

CF-104

- 104717 – Flyhistorisk Museum, Sola, gate guard
- 104730 – Flyhistorisk Museum, Sola
- 104755 – Kjeller Airport
- 104766 – Kjeller Airport, gate guard
- 104800 – Norwegian Aviation Museum
- 104801 – Norwegian Aviation Museum
- 104870 – Bodø Main Air Station
- 104882 – GKN Aerospace, Kongsberg, gate guard
- 104886 – In private ownership/under restoration at Norwegian Armed Forces Aircraft Collection
- 104889 – Sandefjord Airport, Torp

F-104G

- 24+64 – Bodø Main Air Station, gate guard. Ex-German Air Force, painted as RF-104G 61-2626 "FN-B".

TF-104G

- 63-8469 – Norwegian Armed Forces Aircraft Collection

=== Pakistan ===
F-104A

- 56-798, on display at the PAF Museum

F-104B

- 57-1309 (ex-USAF) – Pakistan Air Force Museum, in Karachi

=== Spain ===
F-104G

- 26+23 German Air Force – Air Museum of Spain, in Madrid. The aircraft is an ex-Luftwaffe machine that used to retain its German markings on the left side with Spanish markings on the right side. In its last refurbishment, on show from November 2017, it was changed to a total Spanish livery.
- 63-13643, which flew first for Spain (1965-1972) and then Greece (1972-1991) before being retired from service, was stored until September 2017, when it was returned to Torrejon AB, Spain, and restored to its Spanish livery for static display.

=== Switzerland ===
F-104S

- MM6830 (ex Italian air Force) – Displayed at a roundabout just next to the airport of Grenchen. Now painted in USAF colours as FG-903. In the past it was painted in a blue white breitling scheme. Earlier it was painted as USAF FG-875

=== Taiwan ===
Gate guard, Ching Chuan Kang Air Base / Taichung International Airport

=== Turkey ===
As follows:

F-104G

- 61-2619 – Istanbul Aviation Museum
- 61-2620 – Adnan Menderes Airport
- 61-2633 – Gaziemir, İzmir
- 62-344 – Istanbul Atatürk Airport
- 62-733 – Istanbul Military Museum
- 62-12239 – Işıklar Military High School, Bursa
- 62-12316 – İnciraltı, İzmir
- 62-12344 – Istanbul Aviation Museum
- 63-12718 – Antalya Airport
- 63-12733 – Istanbul University
- 2045 – Balıkesir Airport
- 2066 – Diyarbakır Airport
- 6622 – Military Museum, Balıkesir
- 6667 – Eskisehir Aviation Museum
- 7005 – Mersin
- 7047 – Air War College
- 7051 – Akıncı Air Base
- 7108 – Diyarbakır Air Base
- 7122 – Balıkesir
- 7125 – Celal Bayar University
- 7161 – Işıklar Military High School
- 7164 – Akhisar Air Base
- 7185 – Eskişehir Air Base
- 7186 – Bandırma, Balıkesir
- 7190 – Anadolu University
- 7209 – Yalova Airport.
- 7304 – Bandırma Air Base
- 8060 – Marmaris Airport
- 8090 – Bandırma Air Base
- 8105 – Ankara University
- 8168 – Kocaeli University
- 8205 – Etimesgut Aviation Museum
- 8277 – Yeşilyurt, Istanbul
- 8284 – Karadeniz Technical University
- 8286 – Erzurum University
- 8299 – İzmir Air Base
- 8321 – Batman
- 8346 – Marmara University
- 8347 – İnciraltı, İzmir
- 9052 – Bodrum, Muğla
- 9078 – Yeşilyurt Military High School
- 9083 – Yeşilyurt Military High School
- 9135 – Erzurum
- 9145 – Balıkesir Air Base
- 10–101 – İncirlik Air Base
- 8105 – Middle East Technical University

F-104S

- 6859 – Etimesgut, Ankara
- 6862 – Pamukkale University
- 6868 – Istanbul Aviation Museum
- 6895 – Rahmi Koç Museum
- 7017 – Merzifon Air Base, Samsun
- 6-186 – Bandırma, Balıkesir

CF-104

- 104711 – Etimesgut Aviation Museum
- 104713 – Diyarbakır Air Base
- 104733 – Istanbul Military Museum
- 104751 – Eskisehir Aerospace Factory
- 104770 – Etimesgut Aviation Museum
- 104808 – Diyarbakır Air Base
- 104810 – Etimesgut Barracks, Ankara
- 104841 – Diyarbakır Air Base
- 104869 – Ordu
- 104873 – Akıncı Air Base
- 104891 – Diyarbakır Air Base
- 4-260 – Akıncı Air Base
- 4-733 – Hendek, Sakarya
- 4-955 – Osmancık, Çorum

CF-104D

- 104642 – Etimesgut Aviation Museum

TF-104G

- 65-9415 – Çorlu, Tekirdağ
- 5703 – Erciyes University
- 5711 – Yeşilköy, Istanbul
- 5721 – Kütahya Airport
- 5722 – Afyon Airport
- 5725 – Istanbul Aviation Museum
- 67-5945 – Ahili, Kırıkkale Merkez/Kırıkkale

=== United Kingdom ===
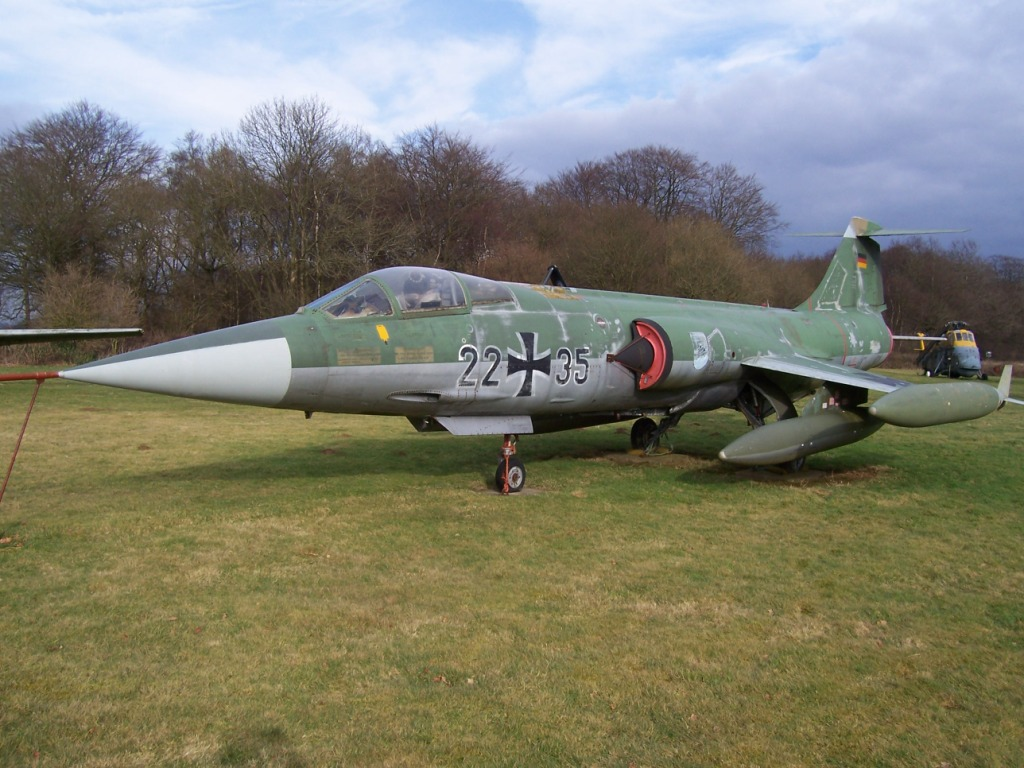
Luftwaffe F-104G at Lasham

F-104G

- R-756 Royal Danish Air Force – Midland Air Museum, Coventry, England
- 22+35 German Air Force – Bruntingthorpe Aircraft Museum, Bruntingthorpe, Leicestershire, England
- 22+57 German Air Force – Bruntingthorpe Aircraft Museum, Bruntingthorpe, Leicestershire, England

=== United States ===
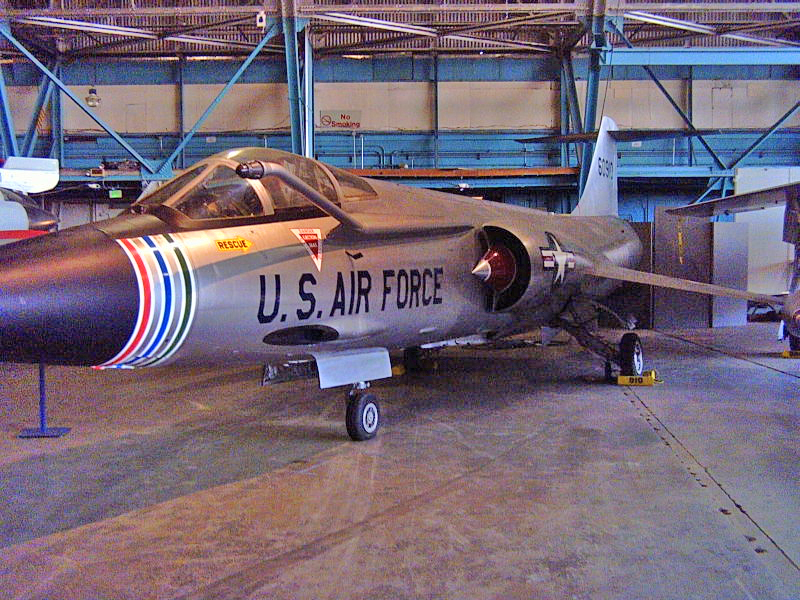
USAF F-104C at Wings Over the Rockies Museum

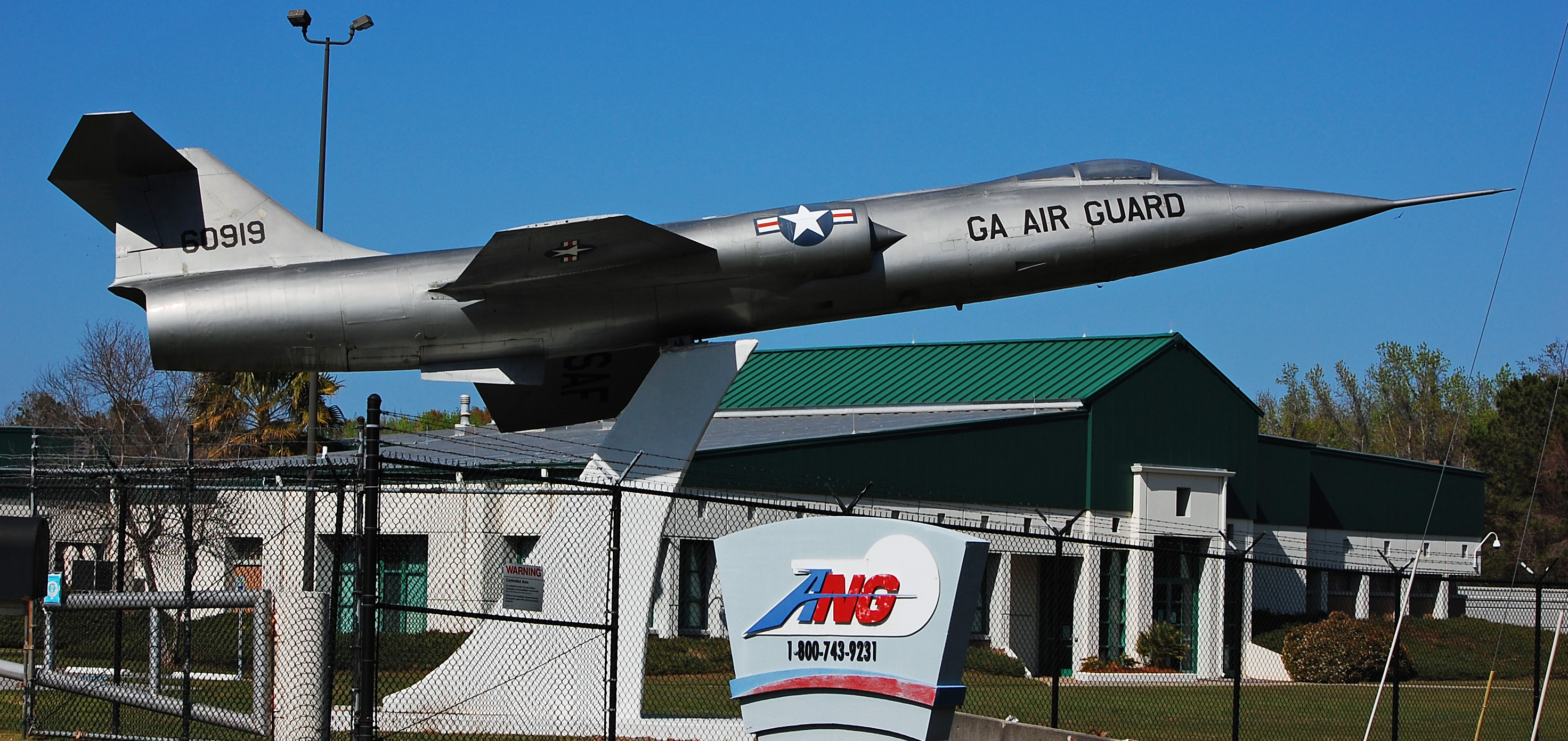
Georgia Air National Guard, Brunswick, Georgia

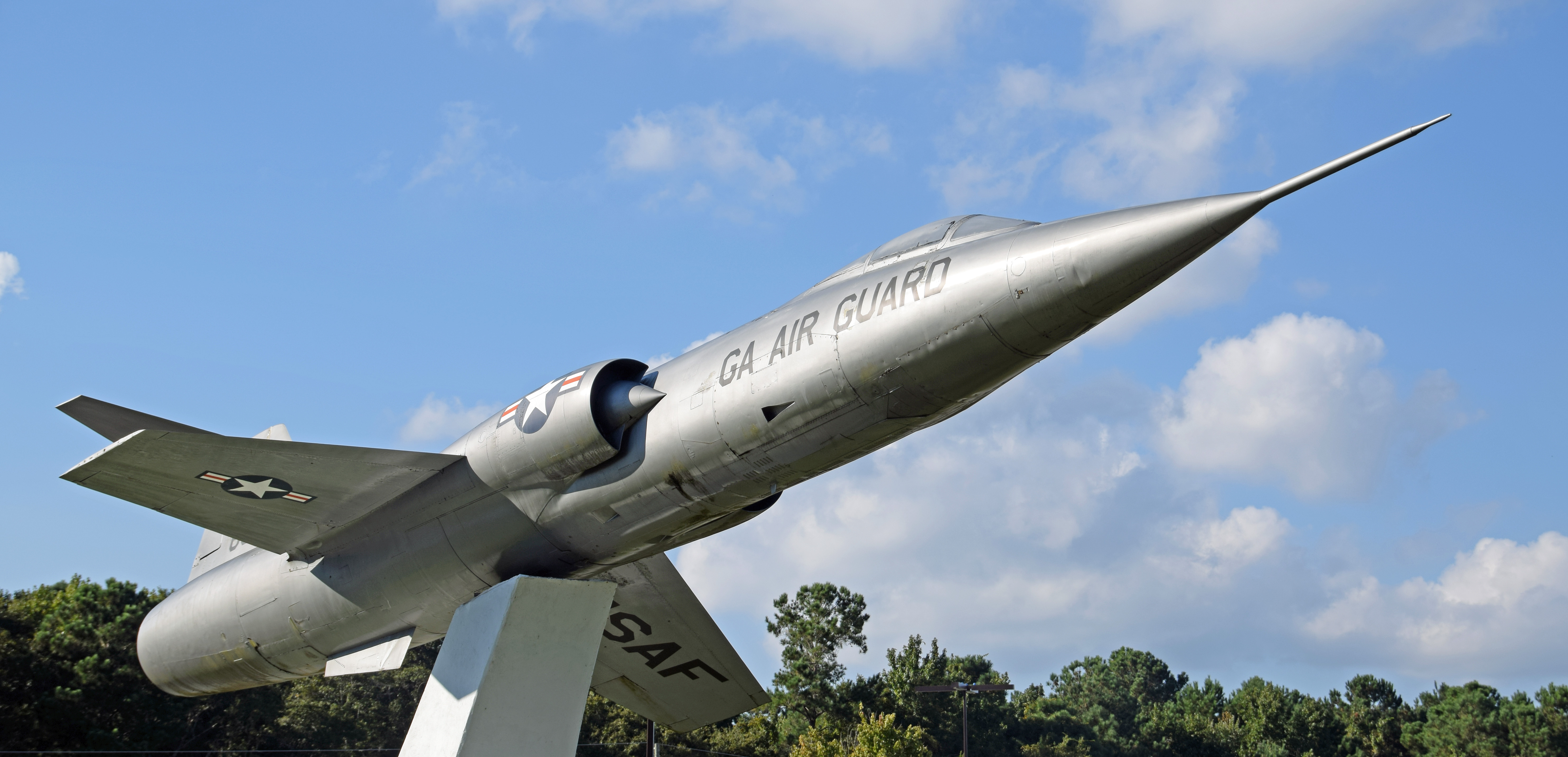
Georgia Air National Guard, Brunswick, Georgia

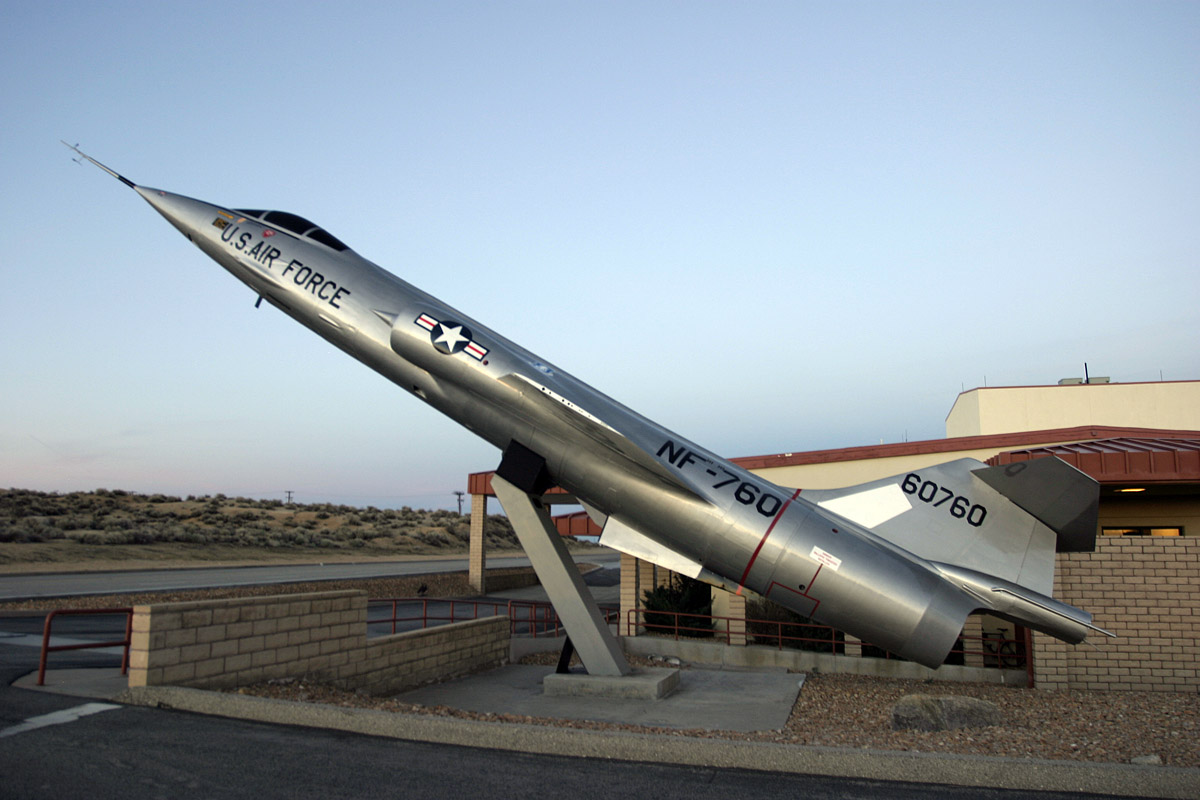
NF-104A at Edwards Air Force Base

Airworthy

TF-104G-M

- 54251 – based at Starfighters Inc in Cape Canaveral, Florida
- 54258 – based at Starfighters Inc in Cape Canaveral, Florida
- 54261 – based at Starfighters Inc in Cape Canaveral, Florida

On display

YF-104A

- 55-2961 (NASA N818NA) – hanging from the ceiling of the Smithsonian's National Air and Space Museum, Washington, D.C.
- 55-2967 – Pueblo Weisbrod Aircraft Museum, Pueblo, Colorado

F-104A

- 56-0732 – McGhee Tyson Air National Guard Base, Alcoa, Tennessee. Formerly on display at Octave Chanute Aerospace Museum, Chanute AFB (formerly), Rantoul, Illinois.
- 56-0748 – Linear Air Park, Dyess AFB, Abilene, Texas
- 56-0750 – Michigan 104, Canton, Michigan
- 56-0752 – Travis AFB Heritage Center, Travis AFB, Fairfield, California
- 56-0753 – Hill Aerospace Museum, Utah
- 56-0754 – National Museum of the United States Air Force, Wright-Patterson AFB, Dayton, Ohio
- 56-0755 - March Field Air Museum, Riverside, California
- 56-0756 (painted as 56-0751) – Nevada County Air Park, Grass Valley, California
- 56-0760 – USAF Test Pilots School, Edwards AFB, Palmdale, California
- 56-0778 – Warhawk Air Museum, Nampa, Idaho
- 56-0780 (formerly 56-0779) – Cavanaugh Flight Museum, Addison, Texas Removed from public display when the museum indefinitely closed on 1 January 2024. To be moved to North Texas Regional Airport in Denison, Texas.
- 56-0786 – Cavanaugh Flight Museum, Addison, Texas. Removed from public display when the museum indefinitely closed on 1 January 2024. To be moved to North Texas Regional Airport in Denison, Texas.
- 56-0790 (NASA N820NA) – Century Circle at Edwards Air Force Base, near Rosamond, California
- 56-0813 – Easton Airport (Maryland), Easton, MD
- 56-0817 – Pacific Aviation Museum on loan from Museum of Aviation, Robins AFB, Warner Robins, Georgia
- 56-0826 – Historic Aviation Memorial Museum, Tyler, Texas

F-104B

- 57-1301 – Kansas Cosmosphere, Hutchinson, Kansas
- 57-1303 (NASA N819NA) – Aerospace Museum of California at the former McClellan AFB in Sacramento, California
- 57-1305, (painted as 57-1319), – Kelly Field (formerly Kelly AFB), San Antonio, Texas
- 57-1330 – Castle Air Museum, Atwater, California

F-104C

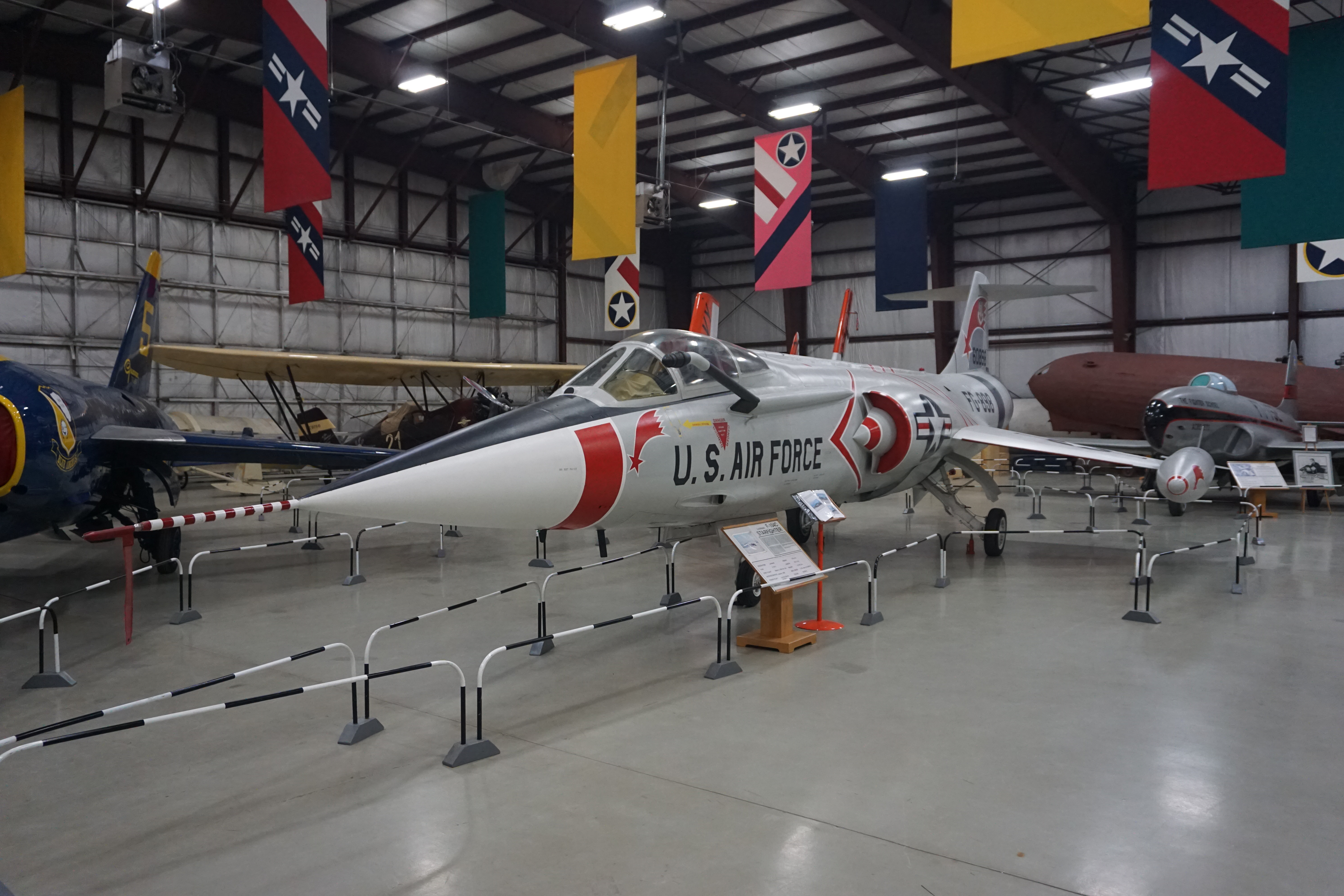
F-104C on display at the Air Zoo

- 56-0886 – Holloman AFB, New Mexico
- 56-0890 – McGhee Tyson ANGB– 134th ARW, Alcoa, Tennessee. It is fixed to a pedestal and serves as a monument.
- 56-0891 – Arizona ANGB – 161st ARG, Phoenix, Arizona. It is fixed to a pedestal and serves as a monument.
- 56-0892 – Luke AFB, Phoenix, Arizona
- 56-0898 – Kalamazoo Air Zoo, Kalamazoo, Michigan
- 56-0901 – New England Air Museum, Bradley International Airport in Windsor Locks, Connecticut
- 56-0910 – Wings Over the Rockies Air and Space Museum (former Lowry AFB) in Denver, Colorado
- 56-0912 – Sheppard AFB, Wichita Falls, Texas. It is fixed to a pedestal and left as a monument.
- 56-0914 – National Museum of the United States Air Force, Wright-Patterson AFB, Dayton, Ohio
- 56-0919 – gate guardian at the 165th Air Support Operations Squadron and 224th Joint Communications Support Squadron facility, Georgia Air National Guard, Brunswick, Georgia. It is fixed to a pedestal and left as a monument.
- 56-0926 – Veterans Memorial Park in Valley City, North Dakota. It is fixed to a pedestal and left as a monument.
- 56-0929 – Southern Museum of Flight, Birmingham, Alabama

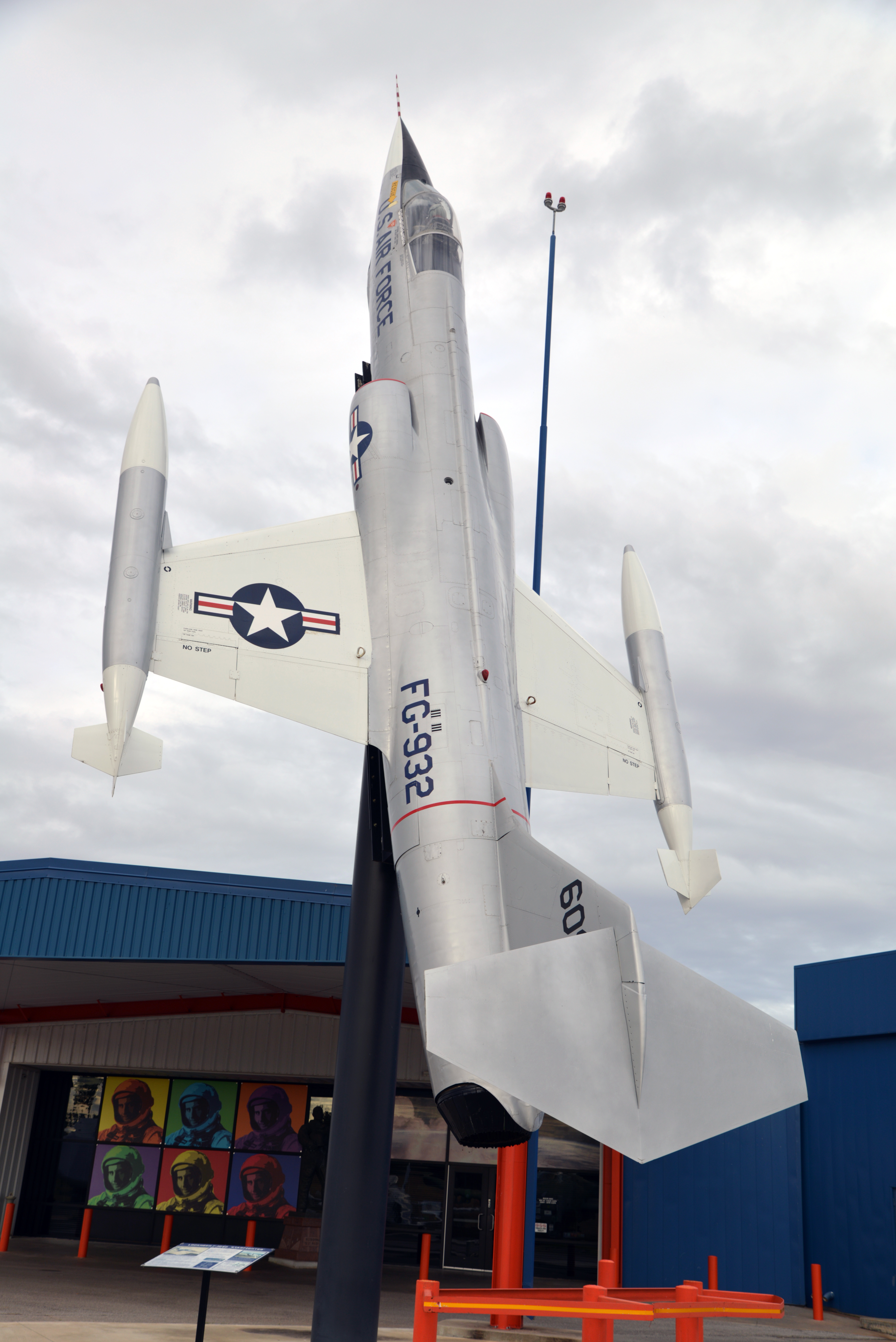
At the Stafford Air & Space Museum

- 56-0932 – Stafford Air & Space Museum, Weatherford, Oklahoma (erroneously painted as 60932) It is fixed to a pedestal and left as a monument.
- 56-0933 – Mid-America Air Museum, Liberal Municipal Airport, Liberal, Kansas
- 56-0934 – Museum of Flight in Seattle, Washington
- 56-0936 (painted as F-104A 56-0808) – Peterson Air and Space Museum, Peterson AFB, Colorado It is fixed to a pedestal and left as a monument.
- 56-0938 – Keesler AFB, Biloxi, Mississippi. It is fixed to a pedestal and left as a monument.
- 57-0915 – Joe Davies Heritage Airpark at Palmdale Plant 42, Palmdale, California
- 57-0916 – Virginia Air & Space Center near Langley AFB in Hampton, Virginia
- 57-0920 – Memorial Park, McEntire ANGB, Columbia, South Carolina.It is fixed to a pedestal and left as a monument.
- 57-0929 – Muñiz Air National Guard Base at Luis Muñoz Marín International Airport, San Juan, Puerto Rico

F-104D

- 57-1314 (painted as F-104B 57-1312) – Castle Air Museum at the former Castle AFB in Atwater, California
- 57-1322 - MAPS Air Museum in North Canton, Ohio
- 57-1323 – Pima Air and Space Museum adjacent to Davis-Monthan AFB in Tucson, Arizona
- 57-1331 – Air Force Armament Museum, at Eglin AFB, Florida
- 57-1332 – American Legion Post 64 in Dutton, Montana
- 57-1333 – California Science Center, Los Angeles, California
- 57-1334 – George Izay Park located at Burbank, California

F-104G

- D-8331 (Royal Netherlands Air Force) – Science Museum Oklahoma, Oklahoma City, Oklahoma
- FX-81 (Belgian Air Force, painted as Royal Netherlands Air Force "D-8090") – Inde Motorsports Ranch, Willcox, Arizona
- FX-82 (Belgian Air Force) – Planes of Fame Air Museum, Chino, California
- FX-84 (Belgian Air Force, painted as NASA N813NA) – Evergreen Aviation & Space Museum, McMinnville, Oregon
- KG200 (NASA N826NA) – Dryden Flight Research Center located inside Edwards Air Force Base, California

TF-104G

- 61-3065 (NASA N824NA) – Estrella Warbird Museum at Paso Robles, California
- buno (NASA N825NA) - Moffett Historical Museum, Moffett Federal Airfield, California

F-104N (NASA)

- N811NA – Embry-Riddle Aeronautical University Prescott, Arizona campus It was flown by Neil Armstrong.
- N812NA – Lockheed Martin Skunk Works facility, Palmdale, California

Under restoration or in storage

F-104B

- 56-1296 – to airworthiness by Starfighters Inc in Cape Canaveral, Florida

TF-104G

- KF+226 – to airworthiness by Classic Aircraft Aviation Museum Hillsboro, Oregon
