= Sysomos =

Social media analytics company

- Type: Private
- Founded: 2007
- Founder: Nick Koudas, Nilesh Bansal
- Headquarters: Toronto, Canada
- Services: social media analytics, social media monitoring
- Website: www.sysomos.com

Sysomos Inc. is a Toronto-based social media analytics company owned by Outside Insight market leaders Meltwater. The company developed text analytics and machine learning technologies for user generated content, and served 80% of the top agencies and Fortune 500.

== History ==
Sysomos was founded by Nilesh Bansal and Nick Koudas. The company is a spinoff of the University of Toronto research project BlogScope. The BlogScope project, which started in 2005, resulted in creation of the underlying content aggregation and analysis engine commercialized by Sysomos. The company raised venture capital in 2008 and was acquired by Marketwire in 2010.

The company's original flagship product, Media Analysis Platform (MAP), mines and analyzes content from social media or user-generated content to create a picture of media coverage.

Sysomos launched its flagship offering MAP in Sept 2007, followed by addition of Heartbeat to its product suite in 2009. In addition to the two main products, the company released FourWhere, a free location-based social search service that mashes up Foursquare in March 2010.

The company also offers Sysomos Heartbeat which provides social media monitoring and engagement capabilities to communication professionals, brand managers and customer support groups. In 2013, Heartbeat was extended to add publishing components to deliver a complete end-to-end social media marketing platform.

On July 6, 2010, it was announced that Marketwire, a press release distribution company, had acquired Sysomos. After the acquisition, Sysomos founders Nick Koudas and Nilesh Bansal, left Sysomos to start Aislelabs.

In February 2015, Sysomos split from Marketwired, as an independent company, and appointed Adnan Ahmed as the new CEO.

In March 2015, newly independent Sysomos launched a redesign for its Heartbeat product and a new API for its MAP product. In the same year, the company acquired Expion. In September 2016, Peter Heffring was announced as the new CEO. In April 2017, Sysomos showcased a new unified platform offering new insights.

In April 2018, media monitoring firm Meltwater announced it had acquired Sysomos. The CEO of Sysomos, Peter Heffring, said the company will continue to operate as an independent unit of Meltwater. Heffring will run the social analytics division of Meltwater.

== Reports ==
Their "Inside Twitter" series of reports is the most extensive third-party survey on Twitter's growth and demographics. Another extensive survey regarding the top 5% of most active Twitter users found that over 25% of all tweets are machine created. The report also confirms Twitter's international growth.

Their "Inside Facebook Pages" report found that only four percent of pages have more than 10,000 fans, 0.76% of pages have more than 100,000 fans, and 0.05% of pages (or 297 in total) have more than a million fans. Their "Inside YouTube" reports focus more on video hosting services and YouTube.

== See also ==
- Social media monitoring
