= Aislelabs =

Canadian technology company

- Type: Privately held company
- Industry: Wi-Fi software
- Founded: 2013; 13 years ago
- Founders: Nilesh Bansal and Nick Koudas
- Headquarters: Toronto, Canada
- Key people: Julie Fry
- Services: Wi-Fi marketing and analytics
- Owner: Constellation Software
- Website: www.aislelabs.com

Aislelabs is a Canadian technology company offering WiFi analytics and marketing platforms. Headquartered in Toronto, it also has important offices in Dubai, London and India. Aislelabs' products are deployed at more than a thousand locations across 25 countries.

Aislelabs provides location analytics, predictive forecasting, personalized marketing, and digital advertising features in partnership with enterprise Wi-Fi vendors such as Cisco, Aruba Networks, Ruckus Wireless, and Open Mesh.

== History ==
Aislelabs was founded by Nilesh Bansal and Nick Koudas After the acquisition of Sysomos by Marketwired, the two created the marketing and analytics platform for the physical brick n' mortar spaces as Aislelabs. While Aislelabs does not have a direct relationship with the University of Toronto, previously Sysomos was a spinoff from the research project BlogScope which started in 2005, and both founders are a recipient of the University of Toronto' Inventor of the Year award.

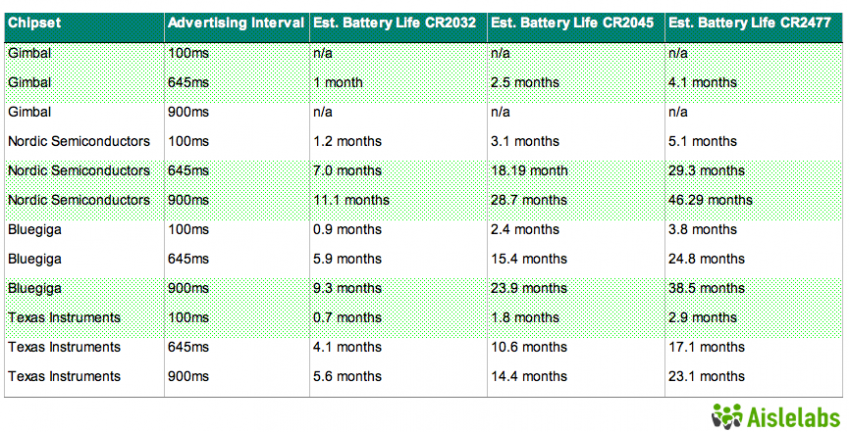
A report from Aislelabs' platform taking in 2014

Aislelabs raised venture capital from Salesforce.com and other institutional investors in 2014.

The company serves large venues across North America, Europe, and Asia, including The Dubai Mall. Across the install base, Aislelabs' big data platform processes over 275 billion data points a year.

In 2021, Aislelabs was acquired by Constellation Software, one of the world's largest operators of verticalized SaaS businesses.

In 2023, Garrett Schemmel was appointed as the new CEO. He oversaw continued growth of the business with a focused on expansion in North America, the Middle East and Latin America. In 2024, Aislelabs underwent a major rebrand of its website. A new brand identity was launched at the same time.

In 2025, Julie Fry joined Aislelabs as General Manager, succeeding Garrett Schemmel. Fry brought a focus on operational modernization and go-to-market discipline, initiating a comprehensive overhaul of the company's internal systems, customer operations, and product strategy.

Under Fry's leadership, Aislelabs began a multi-year cloud migration initiative aimed at modernizing its platform infrastructure and accelerating product development velocity, with an increased emphasis on AI and machine learning capabilities across its Connect, Flow, and Marketing product lines. In November 2025, Aislelabs launched FlowAI, a new product extending the company's venue analytics platform with artificial intelligence-driven insights.

Fry also led a significant buildout of Aislelabs' commercial operations, introducing a formalized CRM and revenue architecture, a restructured pricing and packaging model, and expanded customer support infrastructure. These efforts were designed to support the company's continued growth across its core verticals — retail, airports, and hospitality — and its geographic expansion in North America, the Middle East, and Latin America.

== Competitors ==
The top competitors in Aislelabs competitive landscape are Cloud4Wi, Purple WiFi, Queentessence, Eleven Wireless, Zenreach & Skyfii.
