= Bear raid =

Stock trading strategy

A bear raid is a type of stock market strategy, where a trader (or group of traders) attempts to force down the price of a stock to cover a short position. The name is derived from the common use of bear or bearish in the language of market sentiment to reflect the idea that investors expect downward price movement.

A bear raid can be done by spreading negative rumors or misinformation about the target firm, which puts downward pressure on the share price. This is typically considered a form of securities fraud. Alternatively, traders could take on large short positions themselves, manipulating the price with the large volume of selling, making the strategy self-perpetuating.

== History ==
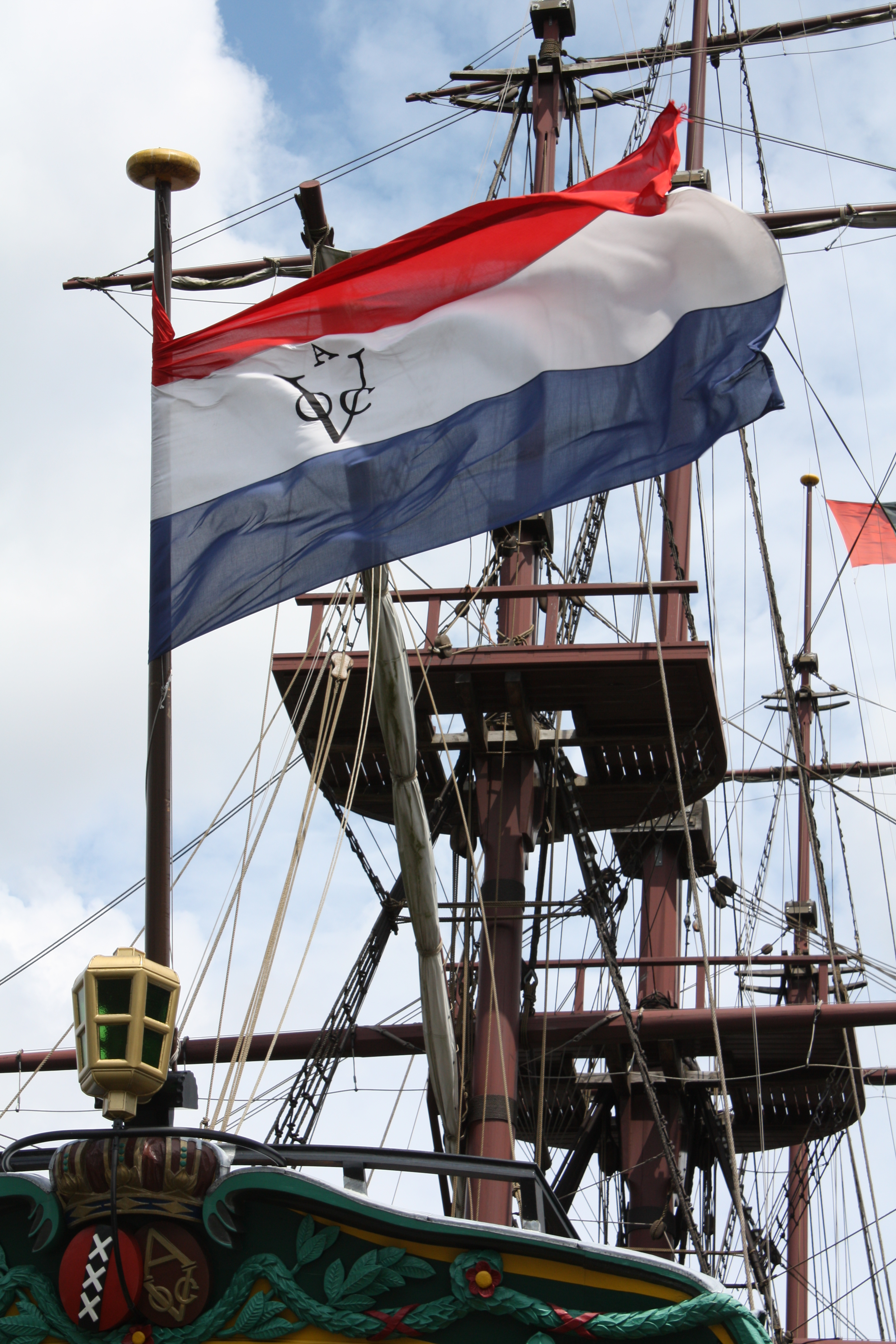
Replica of an East Indiaman of the Dutch East India Company/United East Indies Company (VOC)

The practice of bear raid has its roots in the 17th-century Dutch Republic. In 1609, Isaac Le Maire, a sizeable shareholder of the Dutch East India Company (VOC), organized a bear raid on the stock of the company.

== See also ==
- Short and distort
- Uptick rule
- Bull market
