= Aeritalia F-104S Starfighter =

Italian fighter aircraft

F-104S Starfighter
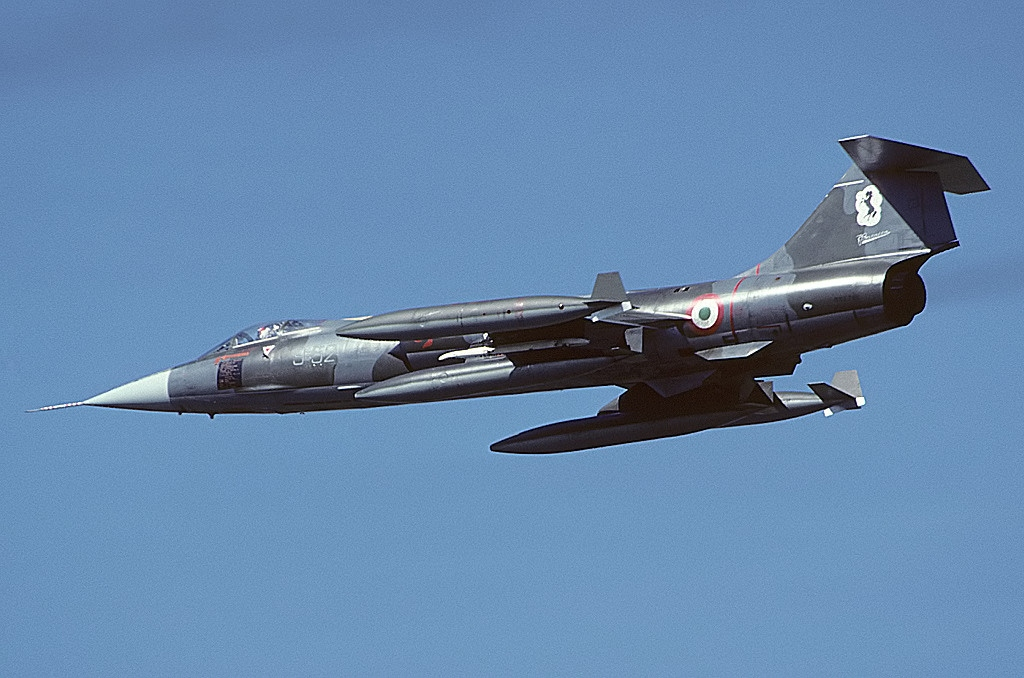

General information
- Type: Interceptor aircraft
- Manufacturer: Aeritalia
- Designer: Lockheed
- Primary users: Italian Air Force Turkish Air Force
- Number built: 246

History
- Manufactured: 1966–1979
- Introduction date: 1969
- First flight: 22 December 1966
- Retired: October 2004
- Developed from: Lockheed F-104 Starfighter

The Aeritalia F-104S Starfighter is a licensed production Italian version of the Lockheed F-104 Starfighter, which served in the Italian Air Force, and was its mainstay from the late 1960s until the beginning of the 21st century. The F-104S also served in the Turkish Air Force until the mid-1990s. The F-104S was the final development of the Starfighter line.

Derived from Lockheed's design studies on a "Super Starfighter", the F-104S was one of the most capable of the F-104 series, and destined to be the last in service worldwide. The F-104S (upgraded to ASA/M standard) was retired from service in October 2004.

== Design and development ==
F-104S in original camouflage scheme with Sparrow missiles mounted under the wings, around 1969.

The F-104 series had entered a second development phase with the F-104G (for Germany, lead country for this version). While the USAF had no more interest in the F-104, Lockheed proposed the Model CL-901 featuring the new J79-GE-19 engine and the improved Sparrow III. Further proposed developments included the CL-958 with larger wings, the CL-981 with retractable canard wings behind the cockpit, and the CL-984 optimised for low-level strike missions. An RF-104G was modified and flew in December 1966 as the prototype CL-901 "Super Starfighter". Externally, the new type had slightly larger air intakes and steel inlet guide vanes that allowed an increase in operating temperature from 121 to 175 °C (250 to 347 °F), enabling a maximum speed of Mach 2.2.

During the first five years in Italian service, 23 F-104G aircraft were lost; as only 80 to 90 F-104s (of 149 acquired) were operational at best, it was decided to purchase a new interceptor and fighter-bomber to reinforce front-line units.

The AMI mid-1960s "AW-X" (All-Weather-eXperimental) requirement for a new all-weather fighter aircraft led to an evaluation of many available types: the McDonnell Douglas F-4B/C Phantom, Dassault Mirage IIIC-1, BAC Lightning, and North American F-100S Super Sabre among others. The eventual choice was the Lockheed CL-980 (a simplified version with the same wings of the projected Model CL-901). On 26 January 1966, the AMI chose the definitive F-104S as their future fighter. The first F-104S was actually a modified Fiat-built F-104G, MM6658, that acted as an aerodynamic prototype and first flew on 22 December 1966, while a second prototype, MM6660, fitted with new avionics systems closer to the final configuration, flew on 28 February 1967. MM.6701, the first production F-104S built by Aeritalia flew on 30 December 1968.

The F-104S was designed to carry AIM-7 Sparrow missiles (while deleting the Vulcan gun). In the attack role, the F-104S had nine hardpoints, and could carry up to seven 227 kg (500 lb) or 340 kg (750 lb) bombs, an improvement over the F-104G, which could lift only half that on five hardpoints, two of which were needed for auxiliary tanks. Theoretically, an F-104S could be equipped with four or five bombs, two droptanks, and two AIM-9s, becoming a dual-role aircraft.

The new type entered service in mid-1969, with 22° Gruppo (51° Stormo); and in that year, the F-104S accumulated 460 flying hours.

The AMI bought 205 examples, all delivered from 1969 to 1979, with the 100th aircraft delivered in January 1973, and the 200th in May 1976. In late 1973, Lockheed signed an agreement with Aeritalia to market the F-104S along with the Aeritalia G.222, while also agreeing to joint engineering work on Lockheed CL-1200 Lancer prototypes. The model was built in two versions; as an interceptor armed with AIM-7 Sparrow missiles (the M61 Vulcan being removed); and as a fighter bomber, with the gun retained and bombs and other air-to-surface ordnance. The models were interchangeable, making it unclear how many were built or rebuilt to these specifications.

== Operational history ==
=== Italian service ===
AMI squadrons equipped with the F-104G and S versions were: 9, 10, 12, 18 (initially for reconnaissance, then dual-role), 20 (training), 21, 22, 23, 28 (reconnaissance), 132 (reconnaissance) 102, 154, 155, and 156 (bombers).

MM6945, the first F-104S-ASA with low-visibility colours

The J79-GE-19 allowed a faster climb, comparable with contemporary fighters (up to 277 m/s (909 ft/s), with a time-to-climb 10,600 m (34,777 ft) of 80 seconds claimed; ten seconds less than the F-104G), with the capability of reaching Mach 2 at 12,000 m (39,370 ft) in around five minutes.

Napoleone Bragagnolo, a test pilot for Aeritalia, was able to land at Ciampino, Rome, 19 minutes and 30 seconds after taking off from Turin in northern Italy. During this flight with two wingtip auxiliary tanks, he climbed 15 km (49,213 ft) and accelerated to Mach 2. The aircraft still had 1,300 L (290 imp gal; 340 US gal) of fuel on board when it landed; enough to reach Palermo, Sicily at subsonic speeds. The average speed for the flight was Mach 1.5.

Even with these new Starfighters, the loss rate remained high, with peaks in 1973 and 1975 (ten F-104s of all versions were lost in AMI service during this period). Up to 1997, Italy had lost 137 (38%) of its F-104s in 928,000 flying hours (14.7 aircraft every 100,000 hours). Despite a drop in the loss rate in the 1980s (with 33 losses between 1981 and 1990 included), the debate about the reliability of this aircraft was often fierce in the mass media, which gave it the nickname bara volante (meaning "flying casket" in Italian, a translation of the similar German nickname Fliegender Sarg). In the 1980s the loss rate dropped, even more so in the 1990s, when all the old versions (except TF-104s) were scrapped.

During the 1991 Gulf War, 6 Italian F-104s were deployed to Turkey alongside German Alpha Jets and Belgian Mirage 5s under a NATO-based operation to protect Turkey against potential Iraqi attacks. 12 Italian F-104s belonging to 4th, 5th, 9th and 37th Stormi were deployed to the Balkans in Operation Deny Flight, Operation Deliberate Force, and Operation Allied Force.

The last Italian F-104 was withdrawn from front line in 2004, after the type had flown around a million flying hours in a total of over 40 years of service. Four F-104s (2 TF-104M and 2 F-104ASAM) were flown by the Italian Air Force Test Center until July 2005. The last F-104's military flight was in Pratica di Mare on July 27.

=== Turkish service ===
Turkey was the only other customer for the Aeritalia F-104S. The initial order was placed in 1974, with the first of 18 examples entering service by December 1974. These first aircraft were a gift from Libya to Turkey during US embargo against 1974 Turkish invasion of Cyprus. These may have been a reward for good relations and Turkish technical assistance to improve the capabilities of the Libyan Air Force. Another 18 were ordered in May 1975, which eventually increased to 40 aircraft, but another batch (for 20 aircraft) was dropped, probably because F-4Es were delivered as well. They served with 142 and 182 Filo from the 1970s, and around a dozen were still in service until the mid-1990s. While 200 Selenia AIM-7 missiles were delivered, Turkish F-104Ss were seldom seen carrying them, thus F-4Es were probably the main users of those missiles.

=== Mid-life updates ===
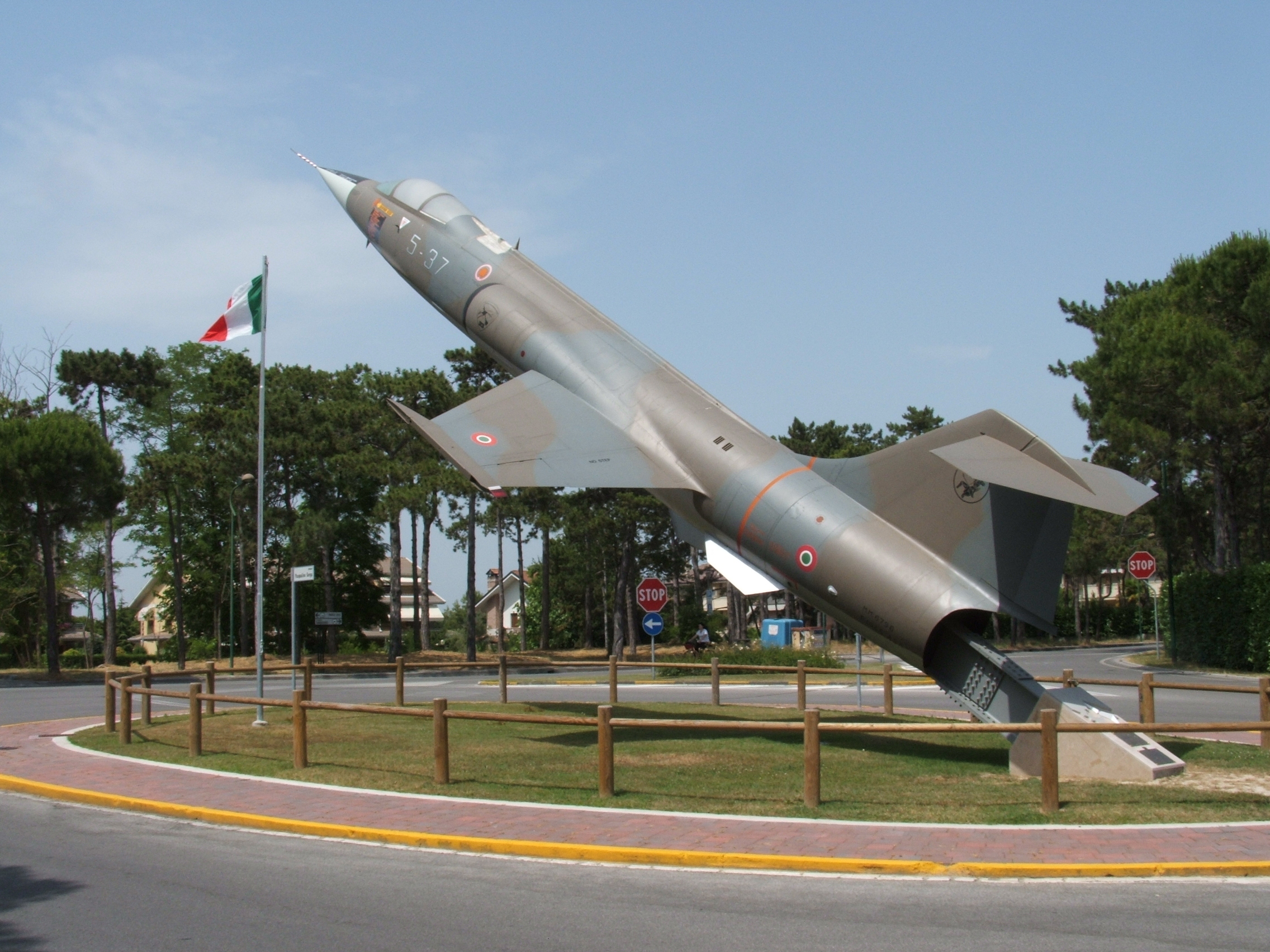
F-104S on display at Lignano Sabbiadoro, in north-eastern Italy

Two further update programs were carried out prior to the introduction into AMI service of the Eurofighter Typhoon, resulting in the F-104S-ASA and F-104S-ASA/M.

==== F-104S-ASA ====
The F-104ASA (Aggiornamento Sistemi d'Arma, Weapon Systems Update), developed in 1986, introduced a FIAR R21G/M1 Setter radar, with 'look-down' capability and compatibility with the Selenia Aspide missile. AIM-9Ls were then used as the main armament, replacing the previous "B" and "F" version of this missile, while the older AIM-7s were retained. One AIM-7 was usually carried under each wing. In total, 147 of the F-104S airframes were converted to ASA standard at an expense of around 600 billion lire, the last ASA model was delivered in the early 1990s.

==== F-104S-ASA/M ====
The ASA/M upgrade (initially known as the 'ECO' (Estensione Capacità Operative) upgrade) focused on improving reliability rather than combat enhancements, and involved 49 ASA aircraft. 15 TF-104Gs were also involved in this program .

== Variants ==
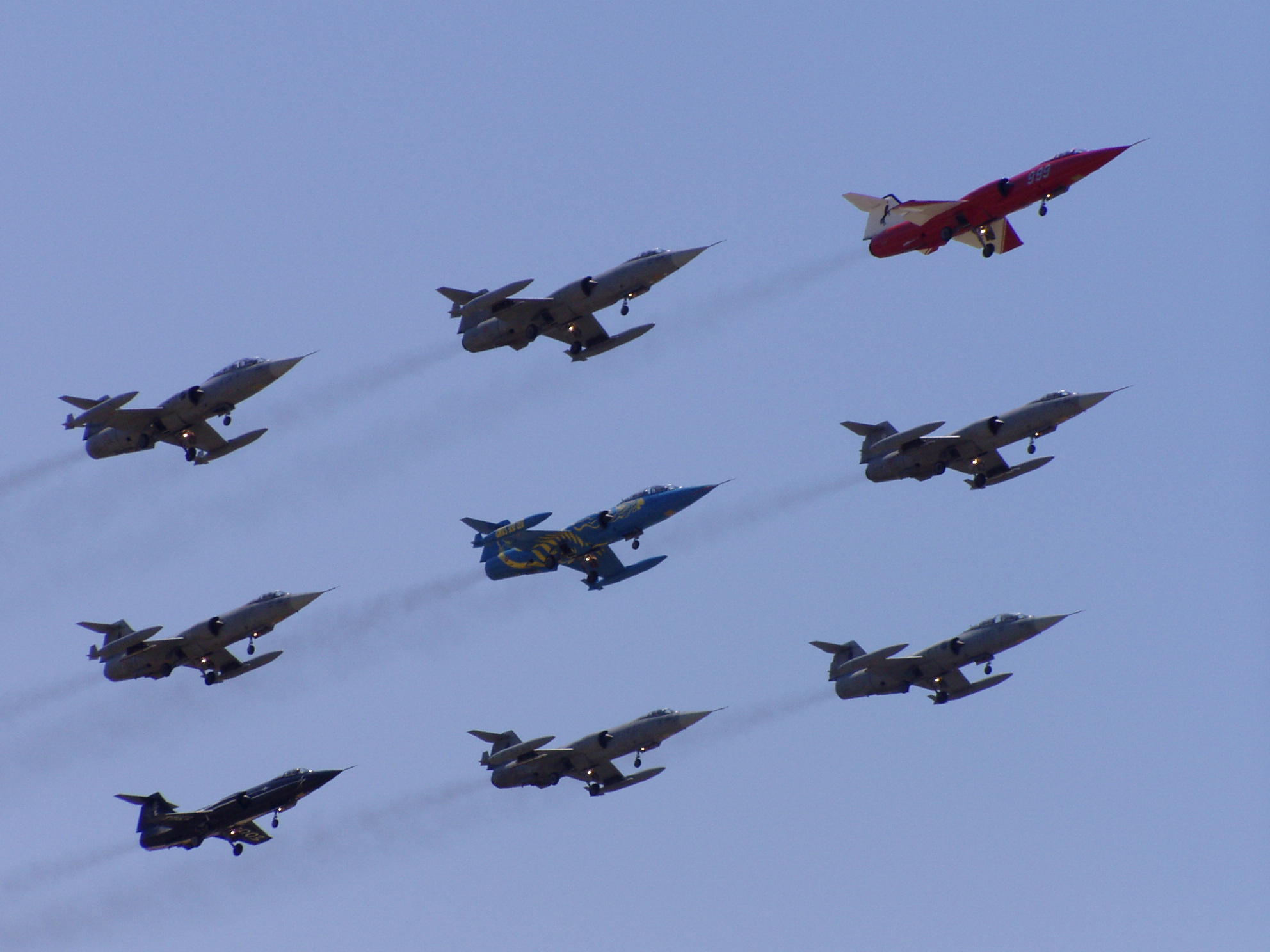
A formation of Italian F-104Ss

F-104S (Lockheed Model CL-901)
246 aircraft produced mainly by Fiat and Aeritalia (one aircraft was lost before delivery), upgraded for the interception role having NASARR R-21G/H radar with moving target indicator and continuous wave illuminator for semi-active radar homing missiles (initially AIM-7 Sparrow), two additional wing and two underbelly hardpoints (to give a total of nine), uprated J79-GE-19 engine with 52.8 kN (11,870 lbf) thrust (79.6 kN/17,900 lbf with afterburner), and two additional ventral fins for increased stability at high Mach numbers. The 20 mm (.79 in) M61 cannon was sacrificed to make room for the missile avionics, the cannon was always fitted to fighter-bomber variants. Up to two Sparrow; and two, theoretically four or six, Sidewinder missiles were carried on all the hardpoints except the central (underbelly), or seven 340 kg (750 lb) bombs (normally, two-four 227–340 kg/500-750 lb).

F-104S-ASA
(Aggiornamento Sistemi d'Arma - "Weapon Systems Update") - An upgraded Italian version, with 147 modified from existing airframes, upgraded with FIAR R21G/M1 radar with frequency hopping, look-down/shoot-down capability, new IFF and weapons delivery computer, and provision for AIM-9L all-aspect Sidewinder and Selenia Aspide missiles. Due to the delays of Aspide integration, it was also called the ASA-1 with Sparrows, and ASA-2 when the Aspide became available, and eventually all F-104Ss were upgraded to ASA-2 standard. The fighter-bombers had no substantial improvements in the "ASA" version, and were later modified to interceptor standards (CI) without the M61.

F-104S-ASA/M
(Aggiornamento Sistemi d'Arma/Modificato - "Weapon Systems Update/Modified") - 49 F-104S-ASA and 15 two-seat TF-104G aircraft were upgraded from 1998 to ASA/M standard with GPS, new TACAN and Litton LN-30A2 inertial navigation system, refurbished airframe, and improved cockpit displays. All strike-related equipment was removed, and the IRST as well (the small unit known as 'IR-Sight', forward the windshield). The last Starfighters in combat service, they were withdrawn in October 2004 (the last unit was 10° Gruppo/9° Stormo, Grazzanise), and temporarily replaced by the General Dynamics F-16 Fighting Falcon, while awaiting Eurofighter Typhoon deliveries.

== Operators ==
Italy

- Italian Air Force

Turkey

- Turkish Air Force

== Surviving aircraft ==
=== Italy ===
- F-104S ASA-M, Italian Air Force MM6940 - Sigonella Naval Air Station, Sicilia
- F-104S ASA, Italian Air Force MM6941 - Istituto Tecnico Industriale, Pisa
- F-104S ASA-M, Italian Air Force MM6887 - as a gate guardian at Decimomannu Air Base, Sardinia

=== Poland ===
- F-104S ASA-M, Italian Air Force MM6876 - Polish Aviation Museum

=== United States ===
- F-104S, Italian Air Force MM6734 - based at Starfighters Inc in Cape Canaveral, Florida.

== Specifications (F-104S) ==
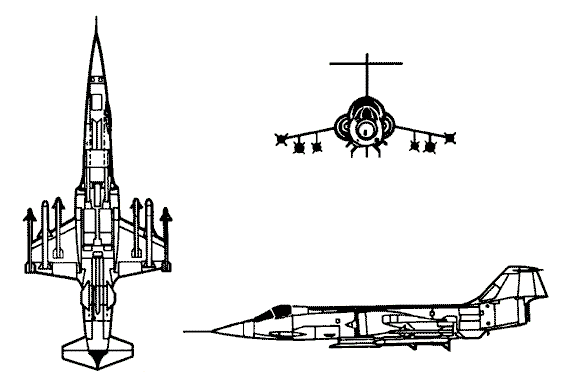

Data from Jane's All the World's Aircraft, 1976-1977.

General characteristics

- Crew: 1
- Length: 16.69 m (54 ft 9 in)
- Wingspan: 6.68 m (21 ft 11 in) without wing-tip stores / tanks
- Height: 4.11 m (13 ft 6 in)
- Wing area: 18.22 m^{2} (196.1 sq ft)
- Aspect ratio: 2.45:1
- Airfoil: Biconvex 3.36%
- Empty weight: 6,750 kg (14,881 lb)
- Gross weight: 9,840 kg (21,693 lb) clean
- Max takeoff weight: 14,060 kg (30,997 lb)
- Fuel capacity: 3,392 L (896 US gal; 746 imp gal) in 5 fuselage bag tanks, with provision for 2x 740 L (200 US gal; 160 imp gal) under-wing drop tanks and 2x 645 L (170 US gal; 142 imp gal) wing-tip tanks
- Powerplant: 1 × General Electric J79-GE-19 afterburning turbojet engine, 52.8 kN (11,900 lbf) thrust dry, 79.62 kN (17,900 lbf) with afterburner

Performance

- Maximum speed: 2,330 km/h (1,450 mph, 1,260 kn) , Mach 2.2 at 11,000 m (36,000 ft) (clean), 1,464 km/h (910 mph; 790 kn), Mach 1.2 at sea level
- Cruise speed: 981 km/h (610 mph, 530 kn) max at 11,000 m (36,000 ft) (clean)

M0.85 economical

- Combat range: 1,247 km (775 mi, 673 nmi) with max fuel (radius)
- Ferry range: 2,920 km (1,810 mi, 1,580 nmi)
- Service ceiling: 18,000 m (58,000 ft)
- Zoom altitude: 27,400 m (89,900 ft) +
- Time to altitude:
  - 11,000 m (35,000 ft) in 1 minute 20 seconds
  - 17,000 m (56,000 ft) in 2 minute 40 seconds

Armament

- Guns: 20 mm (0.79 in) M61A1 Vulcan autocannon with 725 rounds
- Hardpoints: 9 , with provisions to carry combinations of:
  - Rockets: a variety of rocket pods
  - Missiles: 2x Raytheon AIM-7 Sparrow III radar-guided missiles on under-wing pylons or 4x AIM-9L Sidewinder IR-guided missiles on wing-tip launchers and under-fuselage pylons (AIM-9s could be carried on all except centre-line, AIM-7s on outboard pylons only)
  - Bombs: a variety of bombs or napalm

Avionics
NASARR R21G/F15G radar

== See also ==
Related development

- Lockheed F-104 Starfighter
- Canadair CF-104

Aircraft of comparable role, configuration, and era

- English Electric Lightning
- Shenyang J-8
- Sukhoi Su-15

Related lists

- List of fighter aircraft
- List of F-104 Starfighter operators
