= Emulex hoax =

Securities fraud incident

The Emulex hoax was an instance of securities fraud perpetrated by 23-year-old Mark Jakob on August 24, 2000. Jakob realized a profit of more than $240,000 by shorting the stock of Emulex Corporation but was arrested within a week by the FBI and sentenced to 44 months in prison.

== Background ==
Mark Jakob, a 23-year-old student at El Camino Community College living in the Los Angeles area, began working at the press release distribution service Internet Wire in mid-1999, staying at the company for about a year. On the side, he was said to have refurbished used cars. On his AOL profile he listed the personal quote "let it ride" and hobbies including Las Vegas, snowboarding, and day trading. He traded stocks of Emulex for five months before the hoax.

Jakob was resigned on August 18, 2000 as an employee in good standing. The previous day he sold 3000 Emulex shares, betting that the stock price would go down, allowing him to re-purchase the shares for a lower price and keeping a profit. However, as share prices climbed above $100, Jakob faced a loss of almost $100,000 as a result of short-selling stock in the Emulex Corporation, a fiber-optic equipment manufacturer.

== Hoax ==
To cover his losses, Jakob wrote a fake release stating that Emulex had restated its quarterly earnings to change the company's reported profit to a loss, and that Emulex CEO had stepped down. He sent it to Internet Wire, posing as an Emulex publicist using a Yahoo-based email address that had been registered just minutes earlier from a computer at the El Camino Community College library.

The next morning, the phony release was picked up by Bloomberg Television and other news outlets. Emulex's stock price on the NASDAQ stock exchange dropped from $103.94 to $43.00 in 16 minutes of morning trading, losing $2.2 billion in market capitalization. Jakob used a computer at the Mandalay Bay Hotel in Las Vegas to re-purchase the 3000 shares he had previously sold and had $55,000 left over as profit. He then bought an additional 3500 shares for about $50 several minutes later, which he sold three days later for a $186,000 profit. The hoax was revealed within an hour, and the Emulex stock quickly returned to its approximate pre-hoax price.

The press release was a fraudulent short and distort stock manipulation. Bloomberg picked up Jakob's fake release at around 10:13 a.m., just as Emulex, headquartered in California, was opening its doors for the day, and the stock price fell 62% before Emulex found the fake release and asked the National Association of Securities Dealers to halt trading, which it did at 10:29 a.m. Once the release had been conclusively debunked, trading resumed on Emulex and the share price recovered almost immediately to close at $105.75.

== Arrest and aftermath ==
Emulex senior vice president Kirk Roller called for substantial penalties, saying "When you look at this kind of crime, it's electronic terrorism". After a six-day investigation, FBI agents and a federal prosecutor arrested Jakob on August 31 at the El Segundo, California home he shared with his parents. He was charged with one count of wire fraud and one count of securities fraud and represented by a public defender in his first court appearance. The Securities and Exchange Commission soon filed a civil complaint in order to freeze Jakob's assets and recover his profits from the illegal hoax.

Alejandro Mayorkas, US attorney for the central district of California, said that the FBI tracked Jakob's email to Internet Wire to a computer library at El Camino Community College, where Jakob had been a student until early August. Agents recognized that the email was sent by someone familiar with Internet Wire's procedures, and they identified Mark S. Jakob. His stock market trades were a further indication of his involvement, sales on August 17 and 18 at prices from $72 to $92, leading to mounting losses as Emulex stock rose.

Jakob pled guilty in December 2000 and was sentenced to 44 months in prison in March 2001. In July 2001 he settled the SEC's civil lawsuit against him, agreeing to pay approximately $353,000 to cover his $241,000 in gains, $97,000 in trading losses he avoided, and $15,000 in interest, per the terms of the settlement. Jakob additionally agreed to pay a $102,642 civil penalty. Jakob's fraud cost Emulex shareholders an estimated $110 million.
