= BlogScope =

- Website type: Search Engine for the Blogosphere
- Owner: University of Toronto
- Website: www.blogscope.net
- Current status: Shut down

BlogScope was a search engine for the blogosphere with advanced analysis and visualization technology, founded in 2005. as an outcome of a research project at the University of Toronto. As of Apr 2009, the system indexed over 725 million blog posts. The service was shut down in early 2012.

== Sysomos ==
The BlogScope project led to creation of Sysomos, a Toronto-based social media analytics company founded by Nilesh Bansal and Nick Koudas. Sysomos develops two products, Media Analysis Platform (MAP) and Heartbeat, based on the intellectual property created by the BlogScope project. The company was acquired by Marketwire in July 2010. BlogScope had continued to exist as a research project at the university independent of the company, but was shut down in early 2012.

== See also ==
- BlogCN
