= Short and distort =

Securities fraud using negative rumors

"Short and distort" is a type of securities fraud in which investors short sell a stock and then spread negative rumors about the company in an attempt to drive down stock prices.

It is often performed as a form of naked short selling in which stock is sold without being borrowed and without any intent to borrow. Once the stock price has declined, the investor uses the proceeds of the initial sale to buy a larger number of the company's shares than sold originally. Some of the newly purchased stock is used to fulfill the short-selling contract; the remaining shares are then offered for sale, which causes an additional decline in the company's share price.

During the takeover of The Bear Stearns Companies by J.P. Morgan Chase in March 2008, reports swirled that short sellers were spreading rumors to drive down Bear Stearns' share price. Democratic Senator Christopher Dodd felt this was more than rumors and said, "This is about collusion." Chase was victimized by a similar "short and distort" scheme six years earlier when rumors arose about its purported relationship with Enron.

In a December 2006 interview from TheStreet.com's "Wall Street Confidential" webcast, Jim Cramer stated that some hedge fund managers spread false rumors about companies to the media and trading desks to drive a stock down: " ...it's important to create a new truth, to develop a fiction." Cramer said this practice, although illegal, is easy to do "because the SEC doesn't understand it."

Cramer said one strategy to keep a stock price down is to spread negative rumors to reporters he described as "the Pisanis of the world" in reference to CNBC's Bob Pisani. "You have to use these guys," said Cramer. He also discussed getting "the bozo reporter from The Wall Street Journal" to publish a negative article.

== See also ==
- Bear raid
- Emulex hoax
- Pump and dump
