= Marketwired =

Press release distribution service

Coordinates: 43.64328°N 79.380854°W

- Type: Subsidiary
- Industry: News dissemination
- Founded: 1982 (as Canadian Corporate News)
- Headquarters: Toronto, Ontario, Canada
- Area served: Canada, United States, United Kingdom, Europe, Asia, and Latin America
- Key people: Adnan Ahmed (President and Chief Executive Officer)
- Services: Online press release and content distribution. Social media monitoring and research.
- Owner: West Corporation
- Number of employees: 300+
- Subsidiaries: Sysomos
- Website: marketwired.com

Marketwired was a press release distribution service headquartered in Toronto, Ontario, Canada. It was founded in 1993 and incorporated in the U.S. in 1999. In 2018, it was merged into GlobeNewswire.

== Corporate history ==
Marketwired was founded as Internet Wire in October 1994 by PR agency owner Michael Terpin and online marketer Michael Shuler in Los Angeles, California, United States. It received $17.5 million in venture capital in January 2000. The company changed its name to Market Wire in April, 2003, after making a partnership with NASDAQ, where its services would be recommended to listed companies.

In 2000, a former employee of Internet Wire used the service to perpetrate an insider trading scam. He shorted Emulex stock, then published a fraudulent press release reporting problems at Emulex Corporation, which lost 62 percent of its value in morning trading. He was found out by the FBI and sentenced to 44 months in prison.

In 2006, Marketwired (then known as Marketwire) was acquired by CCNMatthews, a 25-year-old news distribution company in Canada. The company adopted the name Marketwire unilaterally. At that point, it was majority-owned by OMERS Private Equity, which manages the private equity activities of OMERS Administration Corporation, a Canadian pension fund. The company's history can be traced back to 1957.

In July 2010, Marketwire acquired Sysomos, a social monitoring and analytics service, offering customers the ability to track their social presence across sites like Facebook and Twitter.

In October 2011, Marketwire filed a lawsuit accusing PR Newswire of trying to steal confidential information and trade secrets, seeking at least $25 million in damages.

In April 2013, Marketwire re-branded, changing its name to Marketwired and introducing the tagline "The power of influence" with an updated logo.

In February 2016, MarketWired was acquired by Nasdaq, Inc.

In January 2018 Nasdaq's public relations business lines were acquired by West Corporation. Marketwired was merged into GlobeNewswire.

== See also ==
- List of press release agencies
