= Starfighters Space =

American flight instruction company

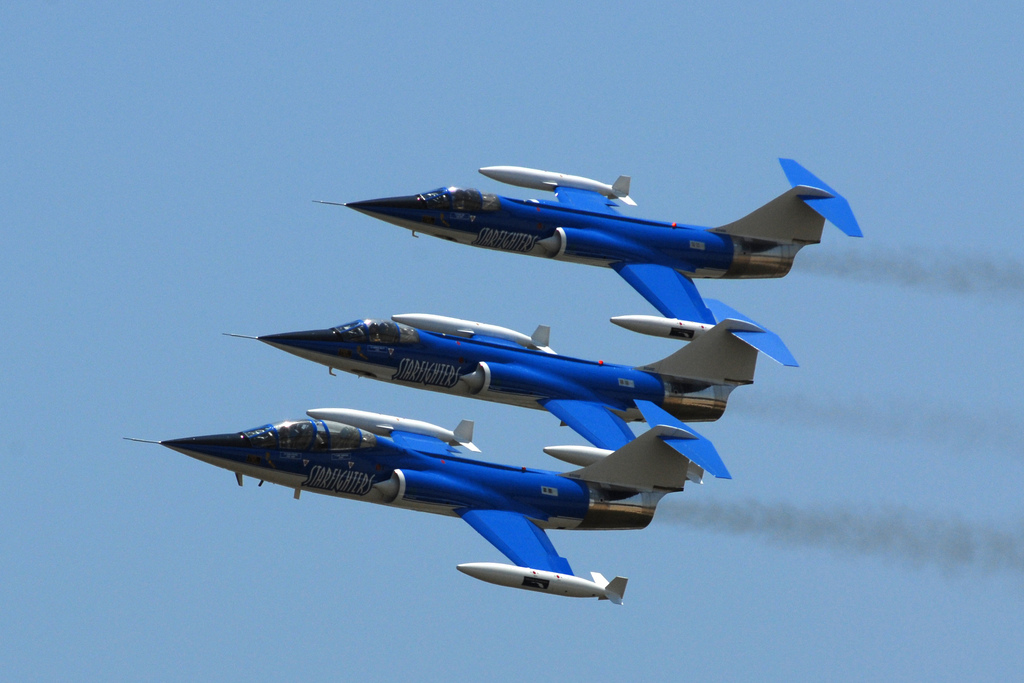
The "Starfighters" display in 2008

Starfighters Space is a company that uses F-104 Starfighters for contract testing and flight simulations.

== History ==
The company, initially called Starfighters, was founded by Rick Svetkoff in 1995 in Clearwater, Florida, to restore and fly three former Canadair CF-104 Starfighters at air shows across the United States and Canada. Initially their CF-104s consisted of a two-seat CF-104D Serial#:104632 (registered as N104RB), and two single-seat CF-104s Serial#s: 104850 (registered as N104RD) and 104759 (registered as N104RN). The aircraft were originally operated with the Royal Canadian Air Force and all later served with the Royal Norwegian Air Force before being imported into the U.S. in the early 1990s.

In the 2010s, the company reduced its air show appearances and took more government and private contract work—for example, providing high-performance photo chase planes for flight tests, simulating enemy aircraft in military exercises, and modelling ballistic missiles for detection system evaluation. In summer 2011, the company acquired five more aircraft. The estimated cost of restoration of each of the five aircraft is $1 million.

In late 2025, the organization created Starfighters Space, focused on air-to-orbit launches of small satellite and payloads. The IPO raised $40 million from 11 million shares of common stock.

In February 2026, Svetkoff stepped down as CEO; he was replaced by Tim Franta, VP of Development since October 2022.

=== Lawsuits ===
In April 2026, Svetkoff sued Starfighters Space and its leaders, alleging breach of fiduciary duty, self-dealing, and mismanagement of corporate assets; he sought damages of more than $26 million and other relief. Starfighters Space denied the allegations and says it plans to defend the suit, countering that internal investigations show questionable actions by Svetkoff.

In May 2026, Starfighters Space filed suit in the Southern District of Florida against suspected short sellers and a short and distort scheme. Their lawsuit (Starfighters Space Inc. et al. v. Does 1 Through 10) charges anonymous actors, in hopes that the discovery portion of the trial would reveal their identities. The "Does" are accused of taking a short position in Starflighter stock and pseudonymously publishing a defamatory and inaccurate report about the company's management and finances, leading to stock declines.

== Fleet ==
- CF-104D, ex-Canadian Armed Forces serial number 104632, registered as N104RB
- CF-104G, ex-Canadian Armed Forces serial number 104759, registered as N104RN
- CF-104G, ex-Canadian Armed Forces serial number 104850, registered as N104RD
- F-104B, ex-USAF serial number 56-1296, registered as N65354
- F-104S, ex-Italian Air Forces serial number MM6734, registered as N993SF
- TF-104G-M serial number 54251, registered as N990SF
- TF-104G-M serial number 54258, registered as N991SF
- TF-104G-M serial number 54261, registered as N992SF
