= Emulex =

Computer peripherals manufacturer

Emulex Corporation

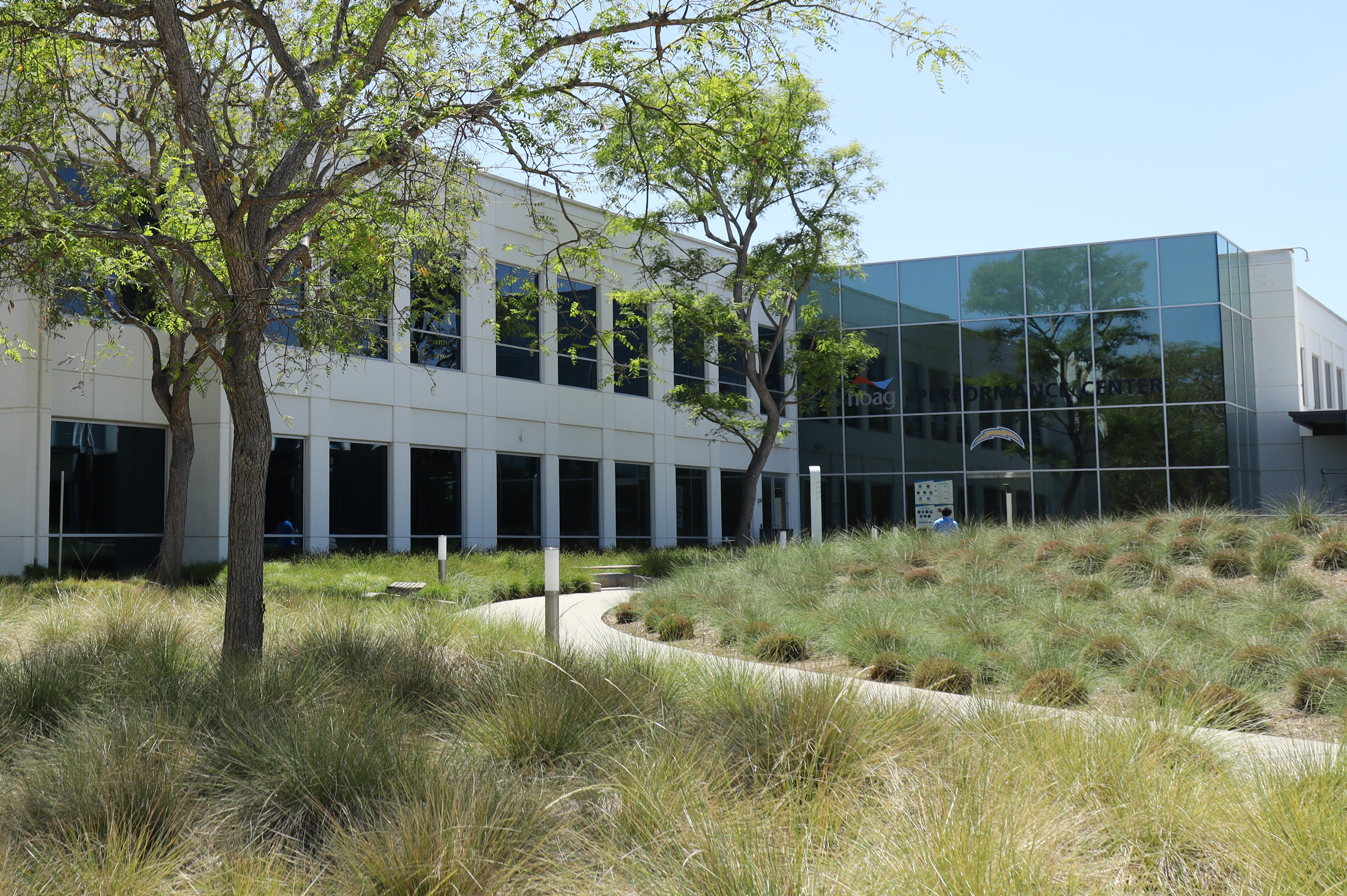
- Former headquarters in Costa Mesa, California
- Type: Public
- Traded as: NYSE: ELX
- Industry: Technology
- Founded: 1978; 48 years ago
- Defunct: 2015; 11 years ago
- Fate: Acquired by Avago Technologies
- Headquarters: Costa Mesa, California, United States
- Key people: Bruce C. Edwards (Executive chairman); Jeff Benck (CEO)
- Revenue: ▲US$478.60 million (2013)
- Net income: ▼ −US$5.21 million (2013)
- Total equity: US$761.8 million (2009)
- Number of employees: More than 1200 (2013)
- Website: emulex.com at the Wayback Machine (archived 2014-12-26)

Emulex Corporation was an American computer hardware company active from 1978 to 2015. The company was a provider of computer network connectivity, monitoring and management hardware and software. The company's I/O connectivity offerings, including its line of Ethernet and Fibre Channel-based connectivity products, are or were used in server and storage products from OEMs, including Cisco, Dell, EMC Corporation, Fujitsu, Hitachi, HP, Huawei, IBM, NetApp, and Oracle Corporation. In 2015, the company was acquired by Avago Technologies.

== History ==
=== 1979–1999 ===
Emulex was founded in 1978 by William Roberts and Paul Rutkowski as a supplier of data storage products and data communications equipment for the computer industry." By 1983, Emulex was able to advertise its products as if it were grocery items: a 2-page spread headlined "One stop shopping for VAX users? Emulex, of course" showed 3 paper bags, each with the Emulex name and logo and each holding a large computer board. One bag also said, "Disk Controllers" while the second bag said, "Communication Controllers;" the third said "Tape Controllers".

Much of Emulex's early market was for Digital Equipment Corporation's VAX and PDP-11 systems. The company's Performance series was a line of terminal servers. The Performance 4000 (P4000), released in August 1988, was the first third-party terminal server compatible with DEC's Local Area Transport protocol. The P4000 had a fixed 16-port configuration and was housed in a plastic shell with an LCD status screen.

In 1992, Emulex spun off their disk controller business into QLogic.

=== 2000 to present ===
Headquartered in Costa Mesa, California, Emulex employed more than 1,200 people in 2013. In 2000, Emulex acquired Giganet for $645 million, and in 2013, it acquired Endace, based in New Zealand. On April 21, 2009, Broadcom made a proposal to the Emulex board of directors to buy all existing shares of Emulex for $764 million, or $9.25 per share, a 40% premium over the stock's closing price on April 20, 2009. After Emulex's board of directors recommended against the sale, Broadcom increased its offer to $11 per share on June 30, which valued the company at $925 million. On July 9, 2009, it too was rejected Broadcom subsequently withdrew its offer.

In February 2015, Avago Technologies Limited announced it would acquire Emulex for $8 per share, in cash. Avago, a spinoff of Hewlett Packard, merged with Broadcom in May of that year. Avago assumed the Broadcom name.

== See also ==
- Emulex hoax
