= Canadair CF-104 Starfighter =

License-built variant of the F-104 Starfighter

CF-104 Starfighter
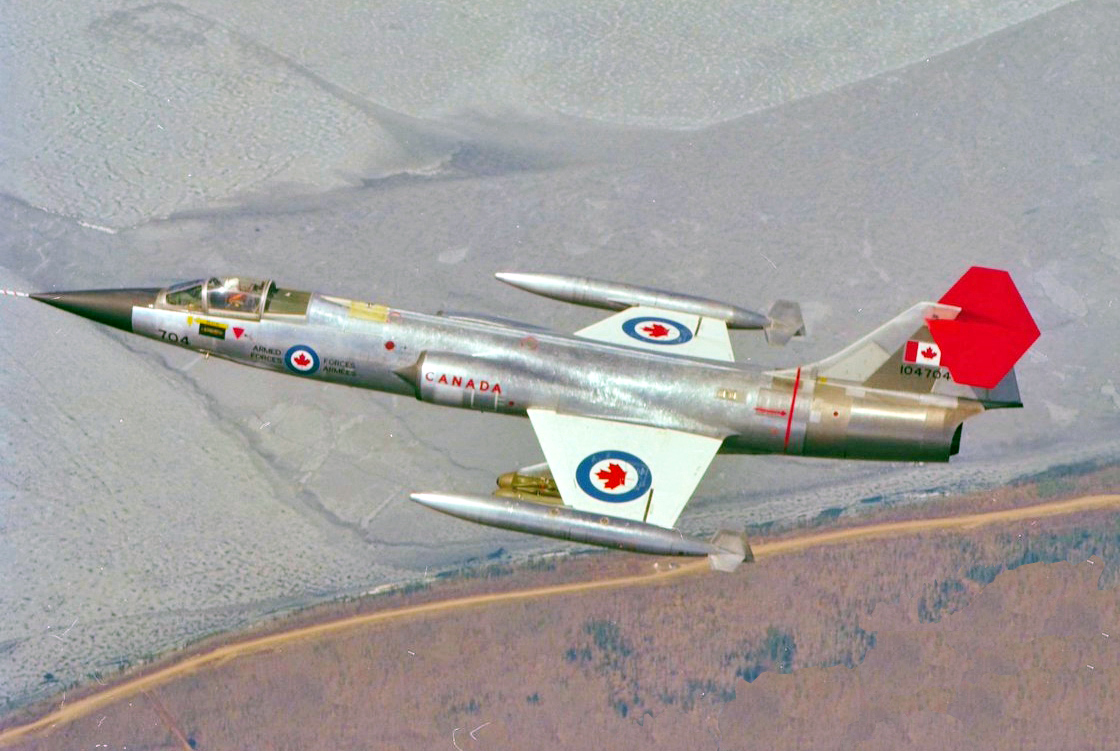
- An RCAF CF-104 in flight

General information
- Type: Interceptor aircraft, Fighter-bomber
- Manufacturer: Canadair
- Designer: Lockheed Corporation
- Status: Retired
- Primary users: Royal Canadian Air Force Royal Danish Air Force; Royal Norwegian Air Force; Turkish Air Force
- Number built: 200

History
- Introduction date: March 1962
- First flight: 26 May 1961
- Retired: 1995 (Turkish Air Force)
- Developed from: Lockheed F-104 Starfighter

The Canadair CF-104 Starfighter (CF-111, CL-90) is a modified version of the Lockheed F-104 Starfighter supersonic fighter aircraft built in Canada by Canadair under licence. It was primarily used as a ground attack aircraft, despite being designed as an interceptor. It served with the Royal Canadian Air Force (RCAF) and later the Canadian Armed Forces (CAF) until it was replaced by the McDonnell Douglas CF-18 Hornet in 1987.

== Design and development ==
In the late 1950s, Canada redefined its role in the North Atlantic Treaty Organization (NATO) with a commitment to a nuclear strike mission. At the same time, the RCAF began to consider a replacement for the Canadair F-86 Sabre series, which had been used as a NATO day fighter. An international fighter competition involved current types in service as well as development, including the Blackburn Buccaneer, Dassault Mirage IIIC, Fiat G.91, Grumman Super Tiger, Lockheed F-104G Starfighter, Northrop N-156 and the Republic F-105 Thunderchief. Although the RCAF had preferred the F-105 Thunderchief equipped with an Avro Canada Orenda Iroquois engine, eventually the choice for a strike-reconnaissance aircraft revolved around cost as well as capability. (Note: The McDonnell F-4 was never considered, although many sources have listed it as a contender and the RCAF's preferred choice.)

A Canadian government requirement for an aircraft that could be manufactured in Canada under licence also favoured the Lockheed proposal, due to a collaboration with Canadair based in Montreal. On 14 August 1959, Canadair was selected to manufacture 200 aircraft for the RCAF under licence from Lockheed, which also gave the Canadian company a contract to manufacture wingsets, tail assemblies, and rear fuselage sections for 66 F-104Gs destined for the West German Air Force. (Note: Canadair eventually built a total of 600 wing, tail and fuselage sections.)

Canadair's internal designation for the aircraft was CL-90; the RCAF initially designated it the CF-111, then the CF-104. Based on the F-104G, the CF-104 was optimized for the nuclear strike/reconnaissance role, fitted with R-24A NASARR equipment for the air-to-ground mode, and could carry a ventral reconnaissance pod with four Vinten cameras. Other differences included retaining the removable refuelling probe, replacing the fuselage-mounted 20 mm (.79 in) M61A1 cannon with an additional fuel cell), and fitting the main undercarriage members with longer-stroke liquid springs and larger tires. The first flight of a Canadian-built CF-104 (s/n 12701) occurred on 26 May 1961. Canadair ultimately made 200 CF-104s for the Canadian military and 140 F-104Gs for Lockheed.

== Operational history ==
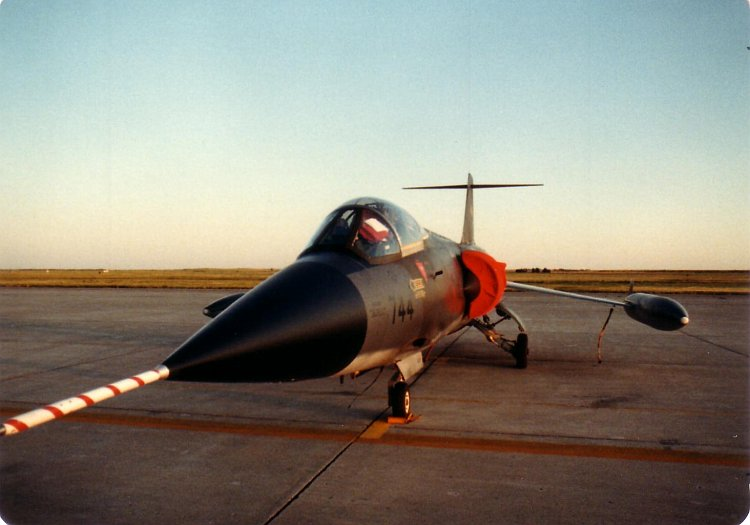
A 417 Sqn CF-104 at CFB Moose Jaw in 1982

The CF-104 entered Canadian service in March 1962. Originally designed as a supersonic interceptor aircraft, it was used primarily for low-level strike and reconnaissance by the RCAF. Eight CF-104 squadrons were originally stationed in Europe as part of Canada's NATO commitment. This was reduced to six in 1967, with a further reduction to three squadrons in 1970. Up to 1971, this included a nuclear strike role that would see Canadian aircraft armed with US-supplied nuclear weapons in the event of a conflict with Warsaw Pact forces. During its service life the CF-104 carried the B28, B43 and B57 nuclear weapons.

When the CAF later discontinued the strike/reconnaissance role for conventional attack, the M61A1 was refitted, along with U.S. Mk. 82 Snakeye "iron" bombs, British BL755 cluster bombs and Canadian-designed CRV7 rocket pods. Although Canadian pilots practised air combat tactics, the AIM-9 Sidewinder missiles were never carried operationally by Canadian Starfighters (however, examples provided to other air forces, such as Norway and Denmark, did carry Sidewinders on a twin-rail centreline station and the wingtip rails). The CF-104D two-seater did not normally carry any armament except for a centreline practice-bomb dispenser.

In the 25 years that Canada operated the CF-104, there were 110 class A accidents that killed a total of 37 pilots. Most were in the early part of the program, centring on teething problems. Of the 110 accidents, 21 were attributed to foreign object damage, all but seven were bird strikes; 14 were due to in-flight engine failures; six were caused by faulty maintenance, and nine involved mid-air collisions. Thirty-two aircraft struck the ground while flying low in poor weather. Of the 37 deaths, four were attributed to system failures; all of the others were attributed to some form of pilot inattention.

The accident rate of the CF-104 compares favourably to its predecessor, the F-86 Sabre. In only 12 years of operation, the F-86 had 282 class A accidents, losing 112 pilots. The Sabre was also a simpler aircraft, normally flown at higher altitudes.

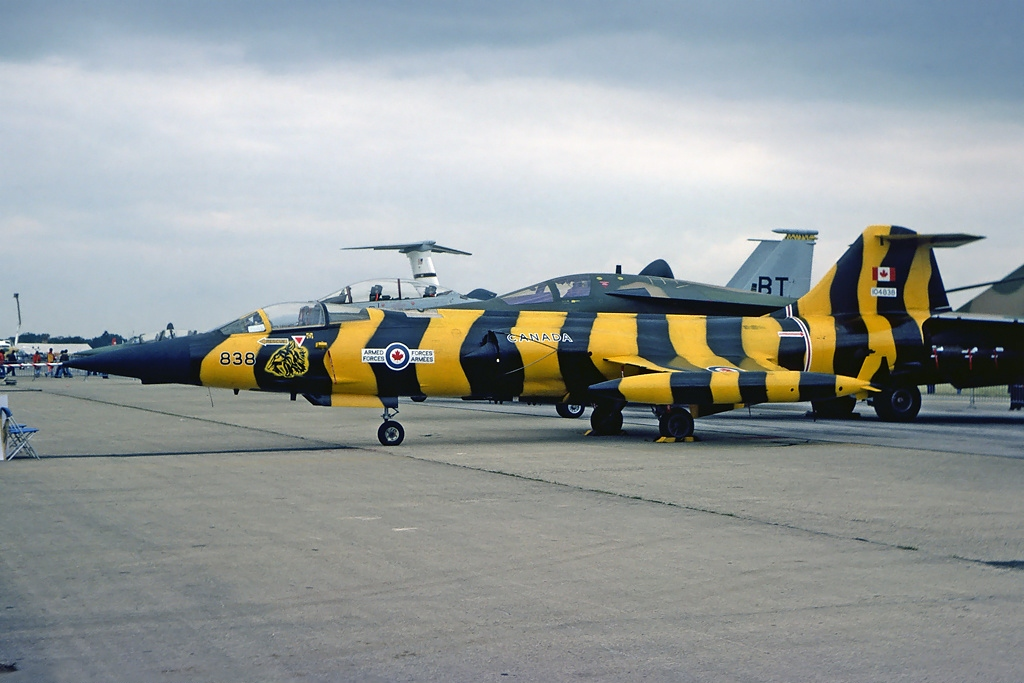
A CF-104 wins the Silver Tiger Trophy at the 1977 Greenham Tiger meet. This exact aircraft crashed a year later due to a compressor stall.

The CF-104 was nicknamed the "Widowmaker" by the press, but not by the pilots and crews of the aircraft. David Bashow wrote, "I never heard a pilot call it the Widowmaker", and quoted Sam Firth as saying, "I have never heard a single person who flew, maintained, controlled, or guarded that aircraft of any force (and that includes the Luftwaffe) call it the Widowmaker". The pilots did refer to it, in jest, as the "Aluminium Death Tube", "The Lawn Dart" and "The Flying Phallus" but generally called it the 104 (one oh four) or the Starfighter.

Low-level attack runs in the CF-104 were done visually at 100 feet AGL and at speeds up to 600 kts. Normal attack speed was 540 kts or 1000 km/h. Low-level evasive maneuvers could increase speeds to supersonic.

The aircraft was very difficult to attack owing to its small size, speed, and low altitude capability. Dave Jurkowski, former CF-104 and CF-18 pilot, said, "Because of our speed, size and lower level operations, no Canadian Zipper driver was ever 'shot down' by either air or ground threats in the three Red Flag Exercises in which we participated."

The CF-104 was very successful in operational exercises held by NATO. The Canadians first took part in the AFCENT Tactical Weapons meet in 1964 and did so every year after that. This meet was a competition between squadrons from Belgium, France, Germany, the United States, Britain, and the Netherlands. Scores were based on several factors. Bomb accuracy, time on target, navigation, mission planning and aircraft serviceability. Pilots were chosen at random from the various squadrons to accurately represent operational capabilities.

=== AFCENT Tactical Weapons Meet (strike era) ===
- 1964: (first participation) Best team went to the two Canadians.
- 1965: Best Nation went to the Canadians, Top individual score went to F/L Frioult of 427.
- 1966: RCAF was second best Nation, Top individual score went to F/L Morion of 421.
- 1967: RCAF best team, McCallum and Rozdeba received awards
- 1968: Second Best Team (427)
- 1970: Canadians were 1st in strike event.

=== AFCENT Tactical Weapons Meet (attack era) ===
biennial schedule.

- 1974: (first participation) Top attack pilot Canadian Larry Crabb
- 1976: 1CAG - Highest scoring nation
- 1978: The meet was renamed the Tactical Air Meet the scoring was marred by squabbles and announced a tie.
- 1980: The Canadians did "well"
- 1982 onward: The meet was changed to a non-competitive setup.

=== Royal Flush ===
A competition for Recce squadrons. The Canadians first took part in 1966 and managed the following awards:

- 1968: First place.
- 1969: First and Second place (441, 439)
- 1970: 439 won the day competition; Canada did not participate in the night event, as the RCAF lacked night vision equipment at the time.

=== Tiger Meet ===
A competition between NATO squadrons with cat mascots.

- 1979: Silver Tiger Trophy
- 1981: Silver Tiger Trophy
- 1985: Silver Tiger Trophy

In the late 1970s, the New Fighter Aircraft program was launched to find a suitable replacement for the CF-104, as well as the McDonnell CF-101 Voodoo and the Canadair CF-5. The winner of the competition was the CF-18 Hornet, which began to replace the CF-104 in 1982. All of the CF-104s were retired from service by the Canadian Forces by 1987, with most of the remaining aircraft given to Turkey.

== Variants ==
CF-104
Single-seat fighter-bomber version for the RCAF.
CF-104D
Two-seat training version for the RCAF.

== Operators ==
Canada

- Royal Canadian Air Force
- Canadian Forces

Denmark

- Royal Danish Air Force

Norway

- Royal Norwegian Air Force

Turkey

- Turkish Air Force

== Accidents and incidents ==
- On 22 May 1983, during an airshow at the Rhein-Main Air Base, a Canadian CF-104 Starfighter crashed onto a nearby road, hitting a car and killing all passengers, a vicar's family of five. The pilot was able to eject.

== Aircraft on display ==
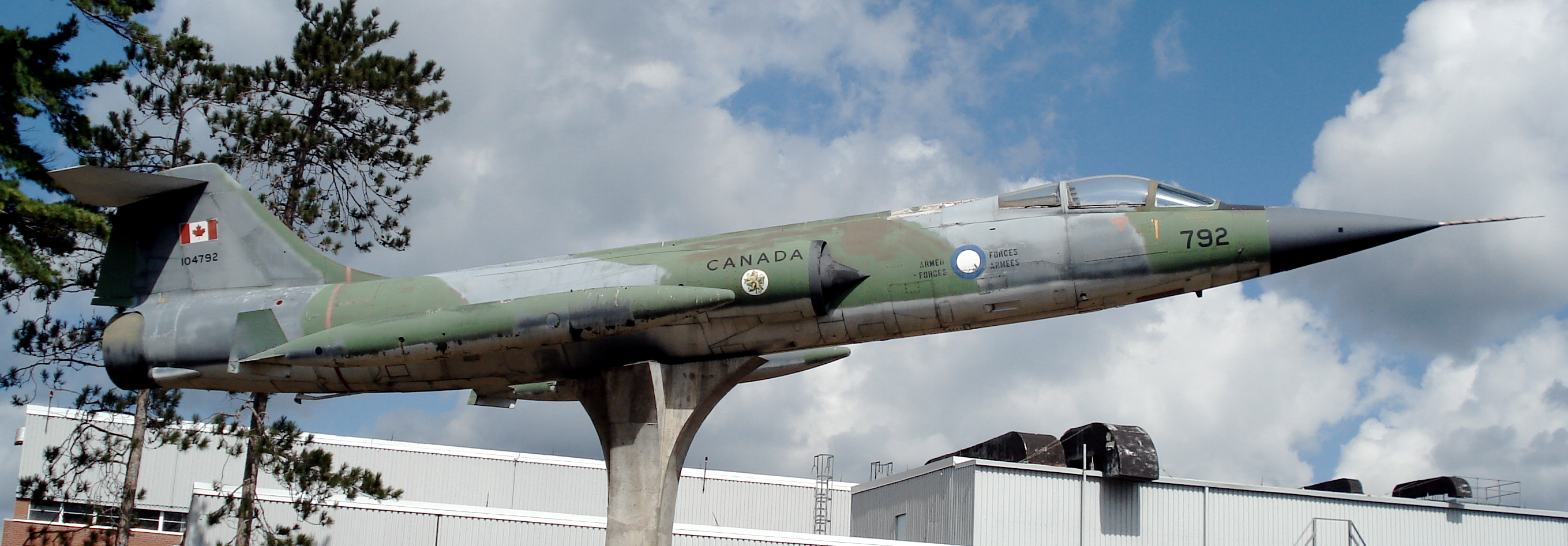
CF-104 displayed at CFB Borden

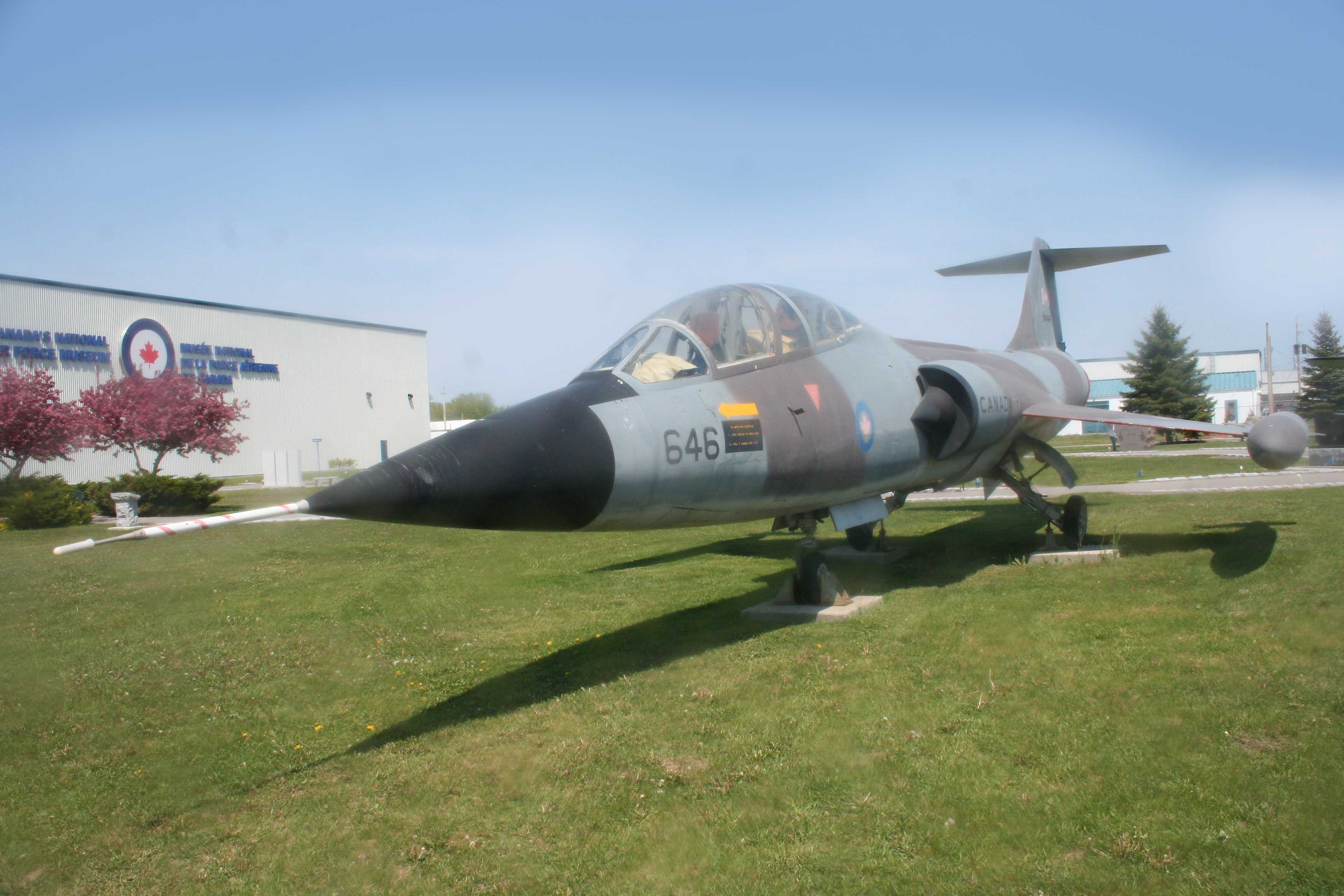
CF-104D Starfighter 104646 at the National Air Force Museum of Canada, CFB Trenton

=== Canada ===
- F-104A, Royal Canadian Air Force 12700 used as a pattern aircraft for the CF-104 model - Canada Aviation and Space Museum
- CF-104, Royal Canadian Air Force 12702 - pedestal monument, Cold Lake South, Alberta located in Joe Heffner Memorial Park.
- CF-104, Royal Canadian Air Force 12703 - Canadian Starfighter Museum
- CF-104, Royal Canadian Air Force 12704 - Fuselage only - restoration project Montreal Aviation Museum - Restoration not yet started

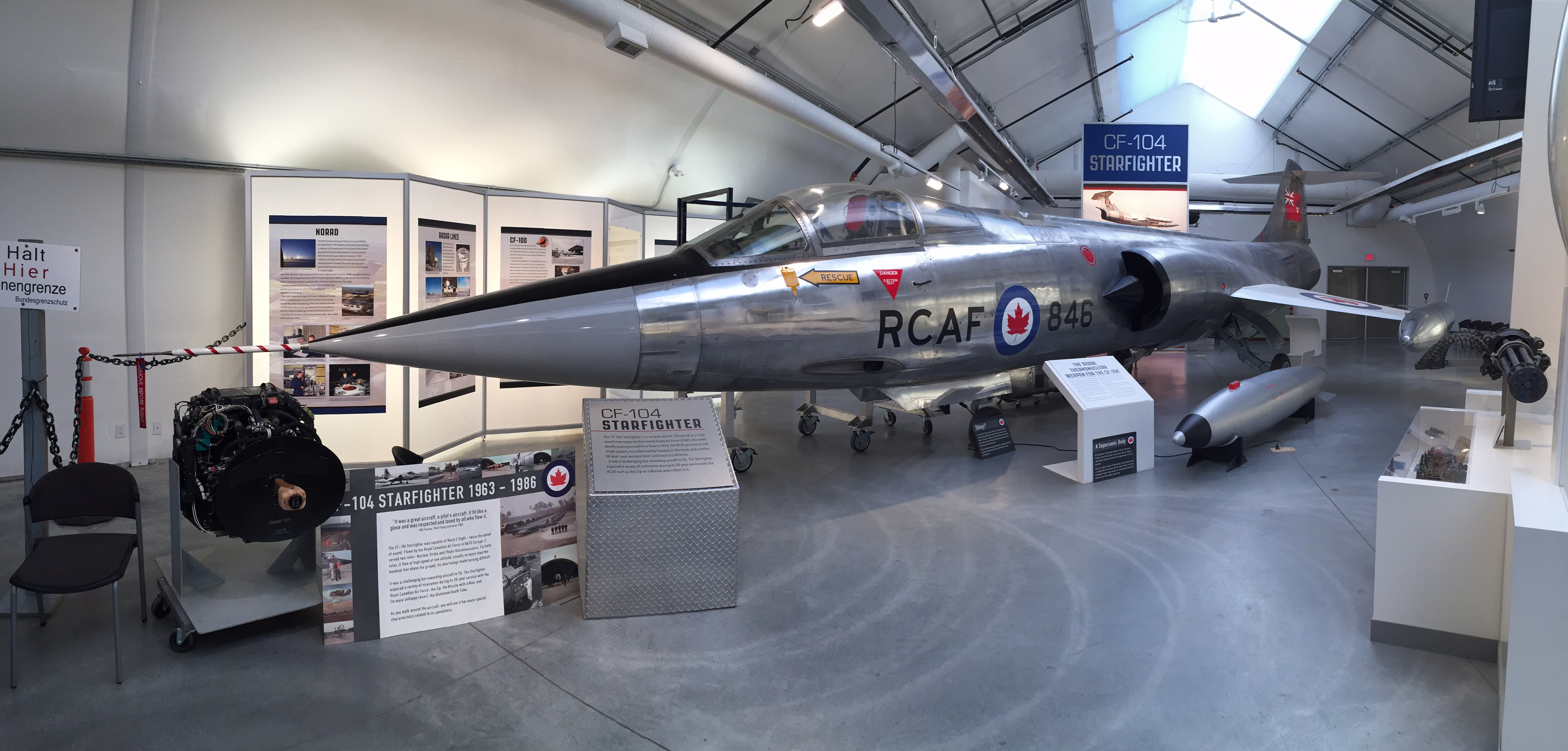
CF-104 on display at the Air Force Museum of Alberta, located within The Military Museums, in Calgary, Alberta, Canada.

- CF-104, Royal Canadian Air Force 104783 - Atlantic Canada Aviation Museum
- CF-104, Royal Canadian Air Force 104784 - CFB St-Jean-sur-le-Richelieu
- CF-104D, Canadian Armed Forces 104646 at the National Air Force Museum of Canada, CFB Trenton
- CF-104, Royal Canadian Air Force 104731 - British Columbia Aviation Museum
- CF-104 and CF-104D RCAF 104756 and 104641 - Canadian Warplane Heritage Museum in Hamilton, Ontario. 104756 is in Tiger Meet colours. This aircraft was originally 12790.
- CF-104, Canadian Armed Forces 104774 at CFB Valcartier
- CF-104D RCAF 104651 Alberta Aviation Museum in Edmonton, Alberta
- CF-104D 645- Canadian Museum of Flight, Langley Regional Airport
- CF-104, Royal Canadian Air Force - Reynolds Alberta Museum in Wetaskawin, Alberta.

=== Denmark ===
- CF-104 Royal Danish Airforce R-814 104814, Display. Egeskov Castle, Denmark

=== Germany ===
- CF-104, Canadian Armed Forces 104785, pedestal mount, Söllingen, Germany.,

=== Hungary ===
- CF-104 Turkish Air Force 63-893 on display at Szolnok Aviation Museum in Szolnok.

=== Norway ===
- CF-104D RNoAF 717 - Displayed on a pedestal outside Flyhistorisk Museum, Sola near Stavanger.
- CF-104D RNoAF 730 - Displayed at the Flyhistorisk Museum, Sola near Stavanger.
- CF-104 RNoAF 755 - At Kjeller, Lillestrøm.
- CF-104D RNoAF 766 - Displayed on pedestal in front of Kjeller Air Station, Lillestrøm.
- CF-104 RNoAF 801 - Displayed at the Norwegian Air Museum in Bodø.
- CF-104 RNoAF 836 - Given to Bardufoss High School. Displayed outside Bardufoss Air Station.
- CF-104 RNoAF 882 - Displayed as gatekeeper at Volvo Arero Norway, Kongsberg.
- CF-104 RNoAF 886 - Forsvarets Flysamling Gardermoen
- CF-104 RNoAF 889 - At Torp Airport, Sandefjord.

== Surviving aircraft ==
=== Norway ===
- CF-104D cn. 104 637 has been restored to flying condition by a group of volunteers called Friends of Starfighter, and is based at Bodø in Norway.

=== United States ===
- CF-104D, Canadian Armed Forces 104632 - based at Starfighters Inc in Cape Canaveral, Florida.
- CF-104G, Canadian Armed Forces 104759 - based at Starfighters Inc in Cape Canaveral, Florida.
- CF-104G, Canadian Armed Forces 104850 - based at Starfighters Inc in Cape Canaveral, Florida.

=== Canada ===
- CF-104D, Canadian Armed Forces 104633 - owned by KF Aerospace Centre For Excellence in Kelowna, British Columbia.

== Specifications (CF-104) ==
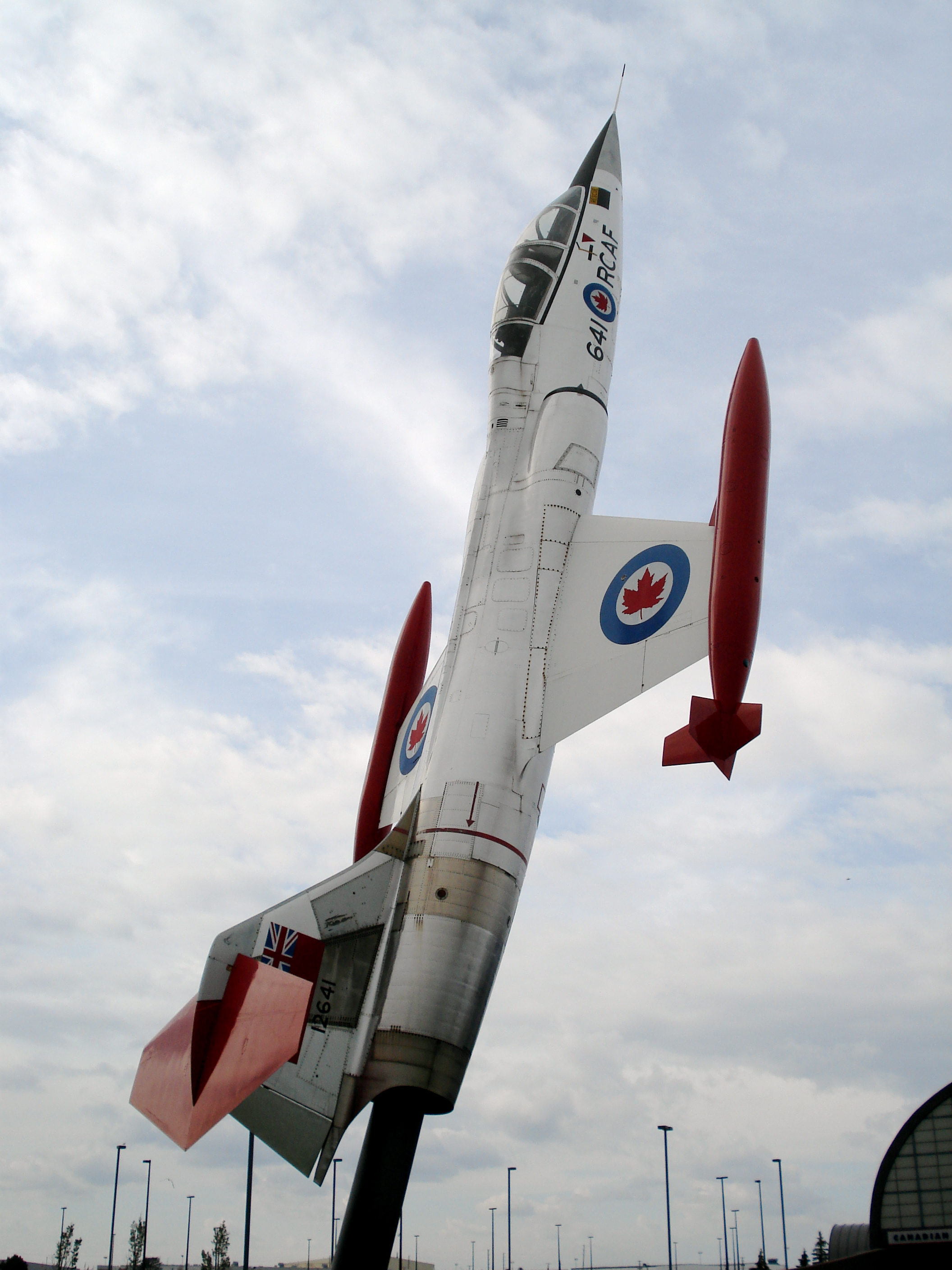
CF-104D in front of Canadian Warplane Heritage Museum

General characteristics

- Crew: 1
- Length: 54 ft 6 in (16.7 m)
- Wingspan: 21 ft 9 in (6.63 m)
- Height: 13 ft 5 in (4.08 m)
- Empty weight: 14,000 lb (6,300 kg)
- Max takeoff weight: 29,038 lb (13,171 kg)
- Powerplant: 1 × Orenda J79-OEL-7 afterburning turbojet, 10,000 lbf (44 kN) thrust dry, 15,800 lbf (70 kN) with afterburner

Performance

- Maximum speed: 1,146 mph (1,844 km/h, 996 kn)
- Range: 1,630 mi (2,630 km, 1,420 nmi)
- Service ceiling: 50,000 ft (15,240 m)

Armament

- Guns: 1× 20 mm (0.79 in) M61A1 Vulcan cannon
- Other: External bombs, rockets and missiles

== Badges ==
CF-104 Crest worn by aircrew and ground crew in the mid-1970s

== See also ==
Related development

- Aeritalia F-104S Starfighter
- Lockheed F-104 Starfighter

Aircraft of comparable role, configuration, and era

- English Electric Lightning
- Sukhoi Su-15

Related lists

- List of aircraft of Canada's air forces
- List of fighter aircraft
- List of Lockheed F-104 Starfighter operators
