= Self-perpetuation =

Capacity of an object, organism, or population to continue its own existence

Self-perpetuation, the capability of something to cause itself to continue to exist, is one of the main characteristics of life. Organisms' capability of reproduction leads to self-perpetuation of the species, if not to the individual. Populations self-perpetuate and grow. Entire ecosystems show homeostasis, and thus perpetuate themselves. The slow modifying effect of succession and similar shifts in the composition of the system can, however, not be neglected in the long run. Overall, life's object's capabilities of self-perpetuation are always accompanied by evolution, a perfect steady state of the biological system is never reached. Sexual reproduction is also a form of imperfect self-replication and thus imperfect self-perpetuation because of recombination and mutation. Organisms are not like self-replicating machine but amass random modifications from generation to generation. The property of self-perpetuation in the strict sense thus only applies to life itself.

In a social context, self-perpetuation is tied to reflexivity and (usually) positive feedback loops:

To overcome strong prior beliefs, strong evidence to the contrary is needed. If a person is predisposed to choosing a certain action, the advice from an advisor who sets a low threshold for recommending the alternative action is not of much use. The preference for like-minded advisors who supply coarse information implies that the advice a person receives is likely to reinforce his existing priors. This effect can lead to polarisation of opinion and the emergence of self-serving beliefs. The learning process is prolonged and the induced short run bias can become perpetual if information is costly

— Wing Suen

Depending on the time scope or the context, self-perpetuation either depends on self-sustainability, or is equivalent to it. While we may talk about the self-sustainability of an ecosystem, this depends amongst other factor on the self-perpetuation of its constituting species.

In computer science, self-reproducing programs constitute an incomplete metaphor for self-perpetuation. A better analogue can be seen in computer viruses which are actually able to self-reproduce - given a suitable computing environment.

== See also ==
- self-stabilization, homeostasis
- self-replication
- self-reference
- recursion
- reproduction
- feedback loop
- cause and effect
- von Neumann universal constructor
