= List of Lockheed F-104 Starfighter operators =

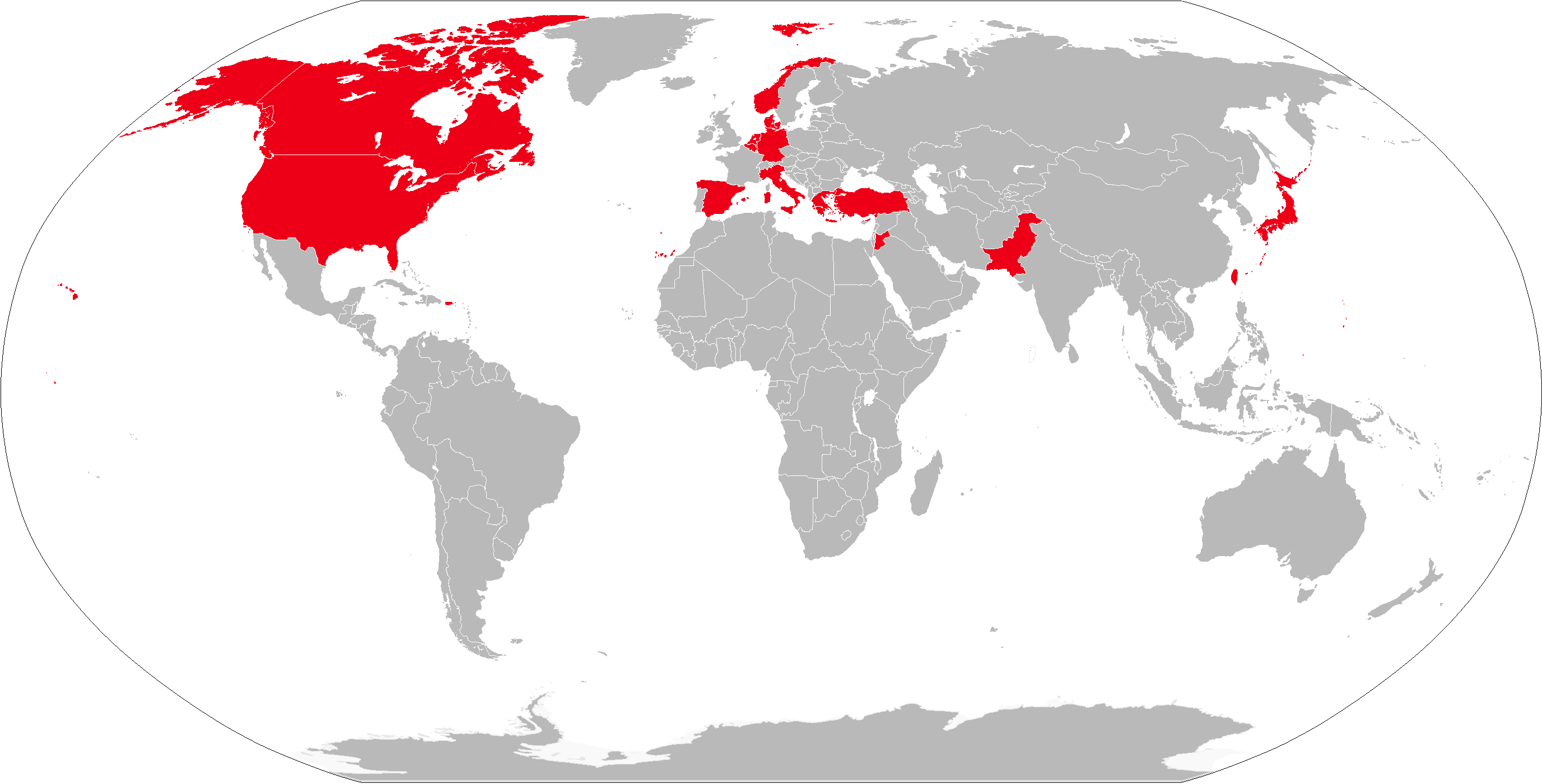
Former F-104 Starfighter Operators

The List of Lockheed F-104 Starfighter operators lists the countries and their air force units that operated the Lockheed F-104 Starfighter.

== Military operators ==
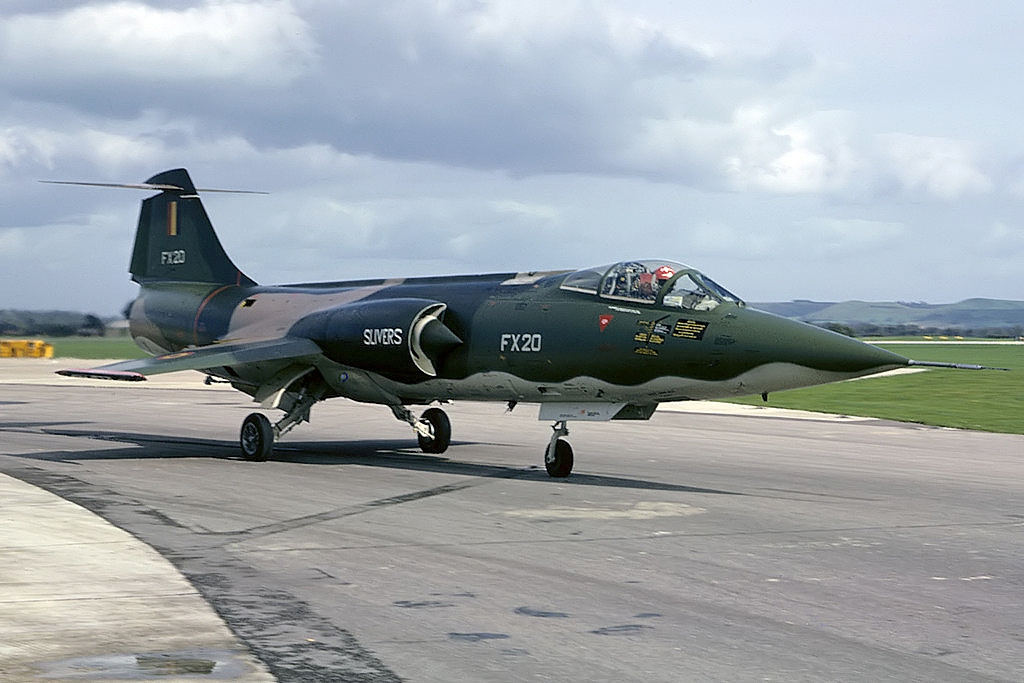
A Belgian F-104

=== Belgium ===
Belgium operated F-104G and TF-104Gs. They served with four squadrons: 23 and 31 (fighter-bombers), 349 and 350 (interceptors), and finally an OCU unit. In total 101 SABCA-built F-104Gs and 12 TF-104G built by Lockheed were purchased (one F-104G crashed before delivery). The Belgian Air Force operated the type from 14 February 1963 to 19 September 1983; some survivors were sent to Taiwan (23 aircraft) and Turkey (18 aircraft). Thirty-eight F-104G and three TF-104Gs were lost in accidents.

Belgian Air Force

- 1 Wing, BAF based at Beauvechain
  - 349th Squadron (Interception)
  - 350th Squadron (Interception)
- 10 Wing, BAF based at Kleine Brogel
  - 23rd Squadron (Fighter/Bomber)
  - 31st Squadron (Fighter/Bomber)

=== Canada ===
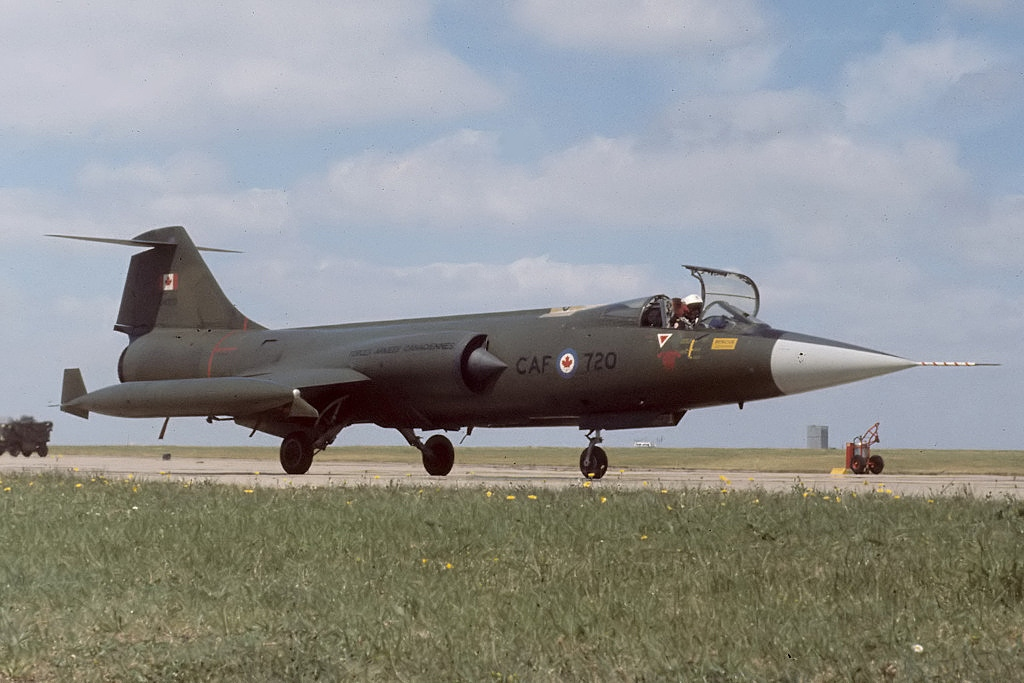
Canadian CF-104

The RCAF, and later the unified Canadian Forces, operated 200 Canadian-built CF-104s and 38 dual-control trainer CF-104Ds (built by Lockheed) between 1962 and 1986. CF-104s were equipped with additional electronic equipment, with a Radar warning receiver function, in the tail and under the nose. Losses were high, with around 110 crashes in Europe. Its heavy usage, mainly at low-level for bombing and reconnaissance missions was a major factor, while bad weather conditions contributed to almost 50% of the accidental losses. The airframes had an average of 6,000 flying hours when phased-out; triple that of Germany's F-104s. Surplus CF-104s and CF-104Ds were later transferred to Denmark, Norway, and Turkey.

Royal Canadian Air Force

- 1 Wing RCAF based at Marville / Lahr, W.Germany
  - No. 439 (Sabre-Toothed Tiger) Squadron
  - No. 441 (Silver Fox) Squadron
- 2 Wing RCAF based at Grostenquin / Baden-Söllingen / Lahr
  - No. 421 (Red Indian) Squadron
  - No. 430 (Silver Falcon) Squadron
- 3 Wing RCAF based at Grostenquin / Baden-Söllingen / Zweibrücken
  - No. 427 (Lion) Squadron
  - No. 434 (Bluenose) Squadron
- 4 Wing RCAF based at Baden-Söllingen
  - No. 422 (Tomahawk) Squadron
  - No. 444 (Cobra) Squadron
- Central Experimental and Proving Establishment/Aerospace Engineering and Test Establishment
- 6 Strike-Recce OTU
- No. 417 Operational Training Squadron RCAF

=== Denmark ===
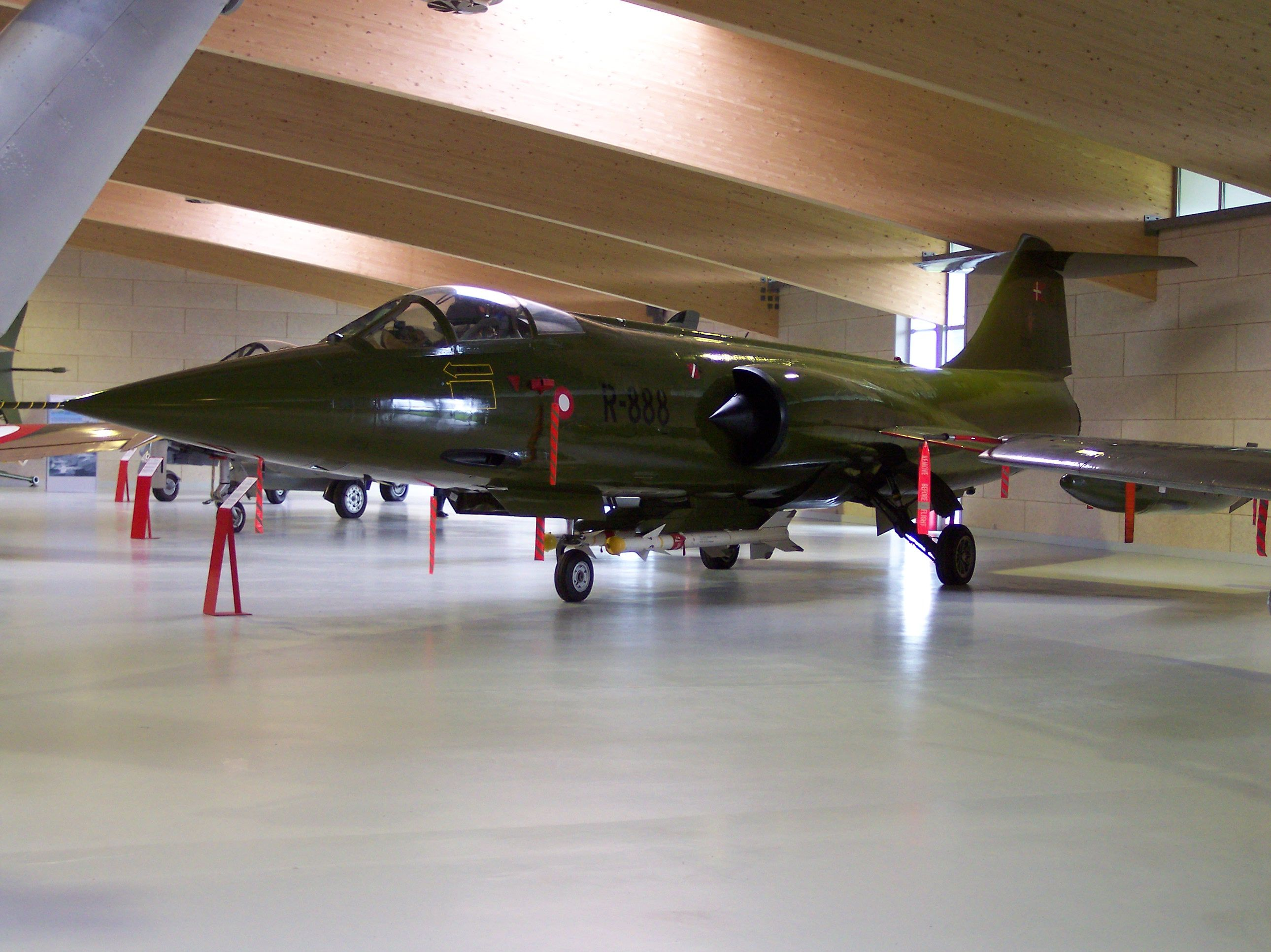
Danish F-104G

Denmark initially received 25 F-104G and four TF-104Gs under the Mutual Defense Assistance Act during 1964–65. Surplus Canadian license-built aircraft were transferred between 1971–73 (15 CF-104 and 7 CF-104D). A total of 51 Starfighters were operated by Denmark before their retirement in 1986. Fifteen surplus F-104Gs and three TF-104Gs were transferred to Taiwan in 1987.

Royal Danish Air Force used the F-104s as interceptors.

- Eskadrille 723 based at Aalborg Air Base
  - Converted from F-86D Sabre in 1965 and switched to F-16A/B in 1984.
- Eskadrille 726 based at Aalborg Air Base
  - Converted from F-86D Sabre in 1964 and switched to F-16A/B in 1986.

=== West Germany ===
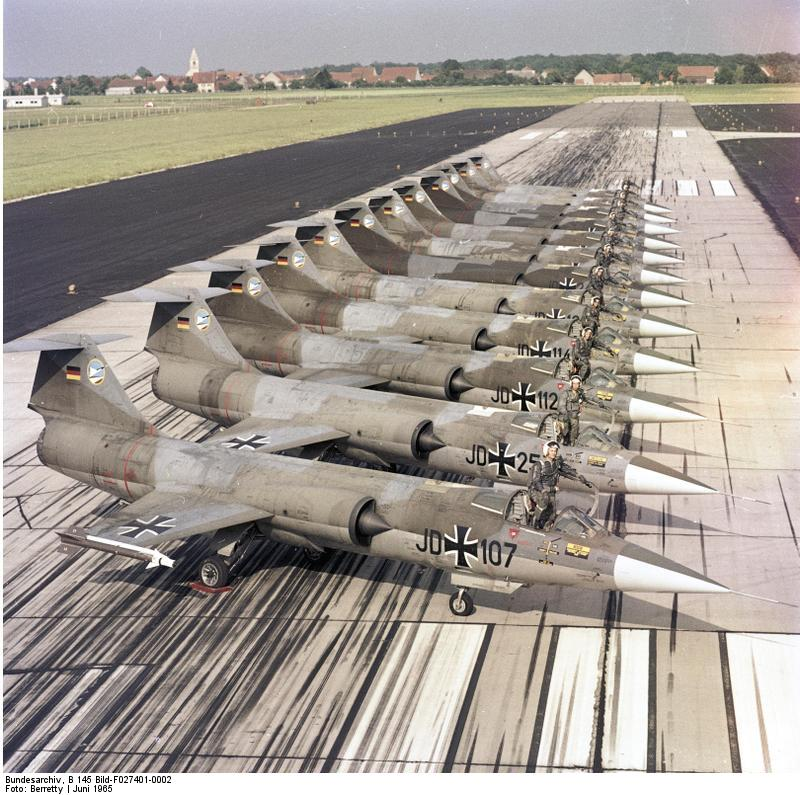
Starfighters of JG 74 in 1965.

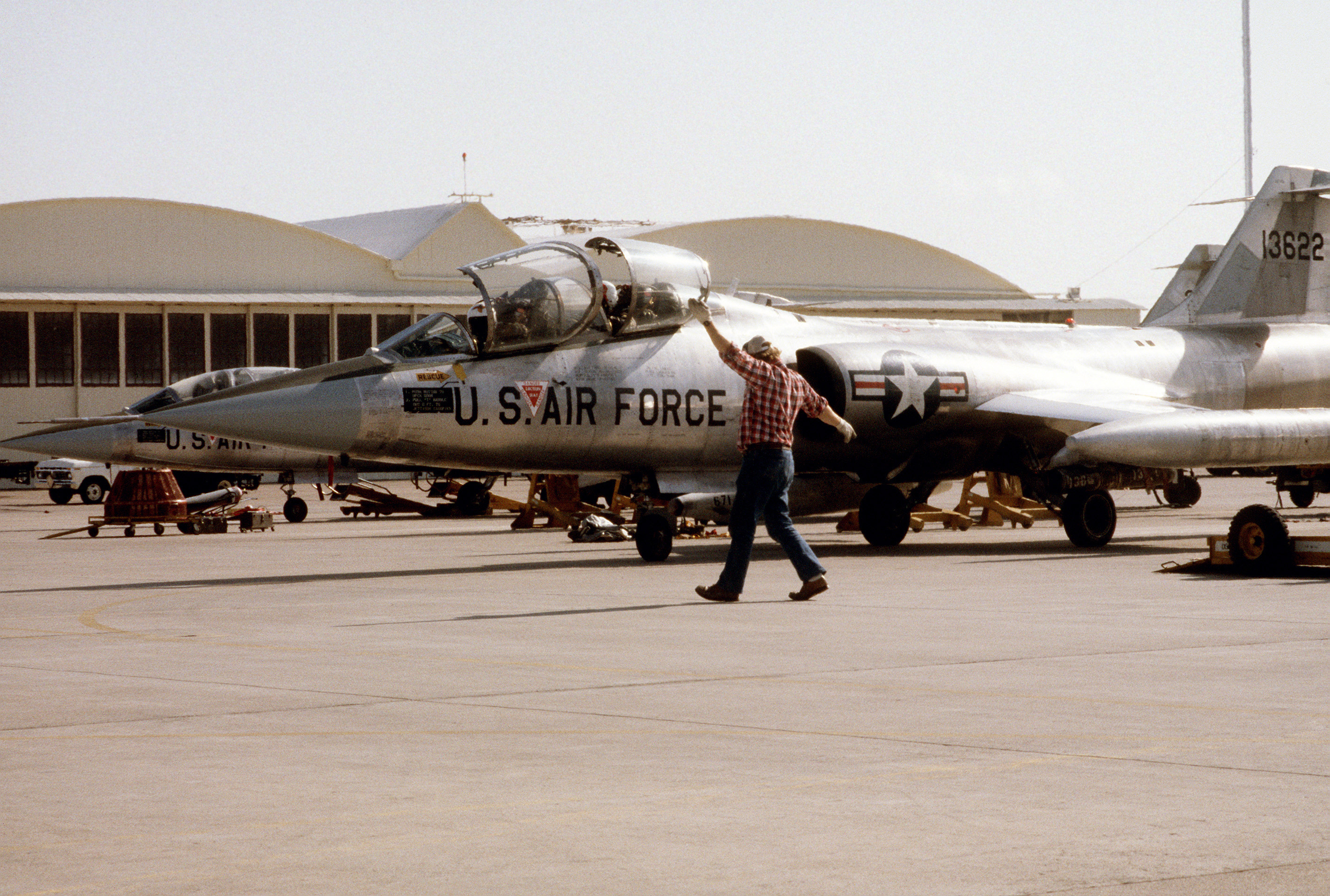
Luftwaffe TF-104G at Luke AFB in USAF colours, 1982.

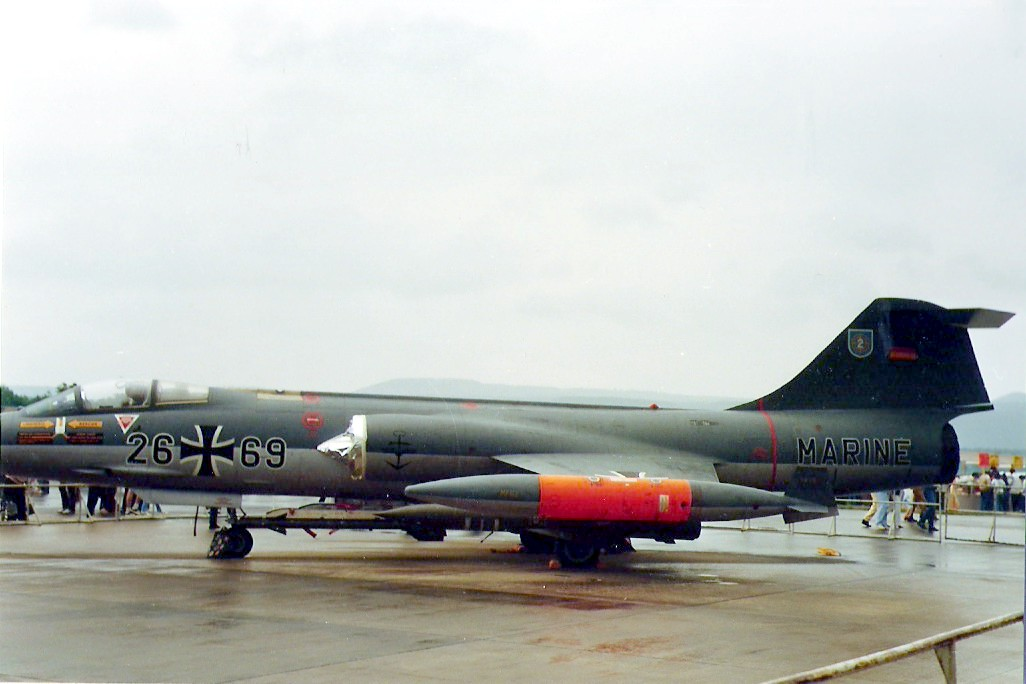
A German Navy F-104G in 1984.

West Germany received 916 F-104s, comprising 749 F/RF-104Gs, 137 TF-104Gs and 30 F-104Fs, forming the major combat equipment of both the German Air Force and Marineflieger. At its peak in the mid-1970s, the Luftwaffe operated five F-104 equipped fighter bomber wings, two interceptor wings and two tactical reconnaissance wings. The Marineflieger operated a further two wings of F-104s in the maritime strike and reconnaissance roles.

The Starfighter entered service with the Luftwaffe in July 1960, with deliveries continuing until March 1973, remaining in operational service until 16 October 1987, and continuing in use for test purposes until 22 May 1991.

The two squadrons operating the RF-104G were re-equipped with RF-4E Phantoms in the early 1970s.

The Marineflieger initially used AS.30 command guidance missiles as anti-ship weapons, but these were replaced with the more sophisticated and longer-ranged radar-guided AS.34 Kormoran missile, allowing stand-off attacks to be carried out against enemy ships. West German Starfighters proved to have an alarming accident rate, 292 of 916 Starfighters crashed, claiming the lives of 115 pilots.

Luftwaffe

- Aufklärungsgeschwader 51 "Immelmann" based at Ingolstadt / Manching and previously Bremgarten. (Reconnaissance)
- Aufklärungsgeschwader 52 based at Leck, Nordfriesland (Reconnaissance)
- Jagdbombergeschwader 31 "Boelcke" based at Nörvenich (Fighter/Bomber)
- Jagdbombergeschwader 32 based at Lechfeld (Fighter/Bomber)
- Jagdbombergeschwader 33 based at Büchel (Fighter/Bomber)
- Jagdbombergeschwader 34 based at Memmingen (Fighter/Bomber)
- Jagdbombergeschwader 36 based at Rheine-Hopsten (Fighter/Bomber)
- Jagdgeschwader 71 "Richthofen" based at Wittmundhafen (Interception)
- Jagdgeschwader 74 based at Neuburg (Interception)

Marineflieger

- Marinefliegergeschwader 1 based at Schleswig-Jagel (Anti-Shipping & Reconnaissance)
- Marinefliegergeschwader 2 based at Eggebek (Anti-Shipping & Reconnaissance)

=== Greece ===
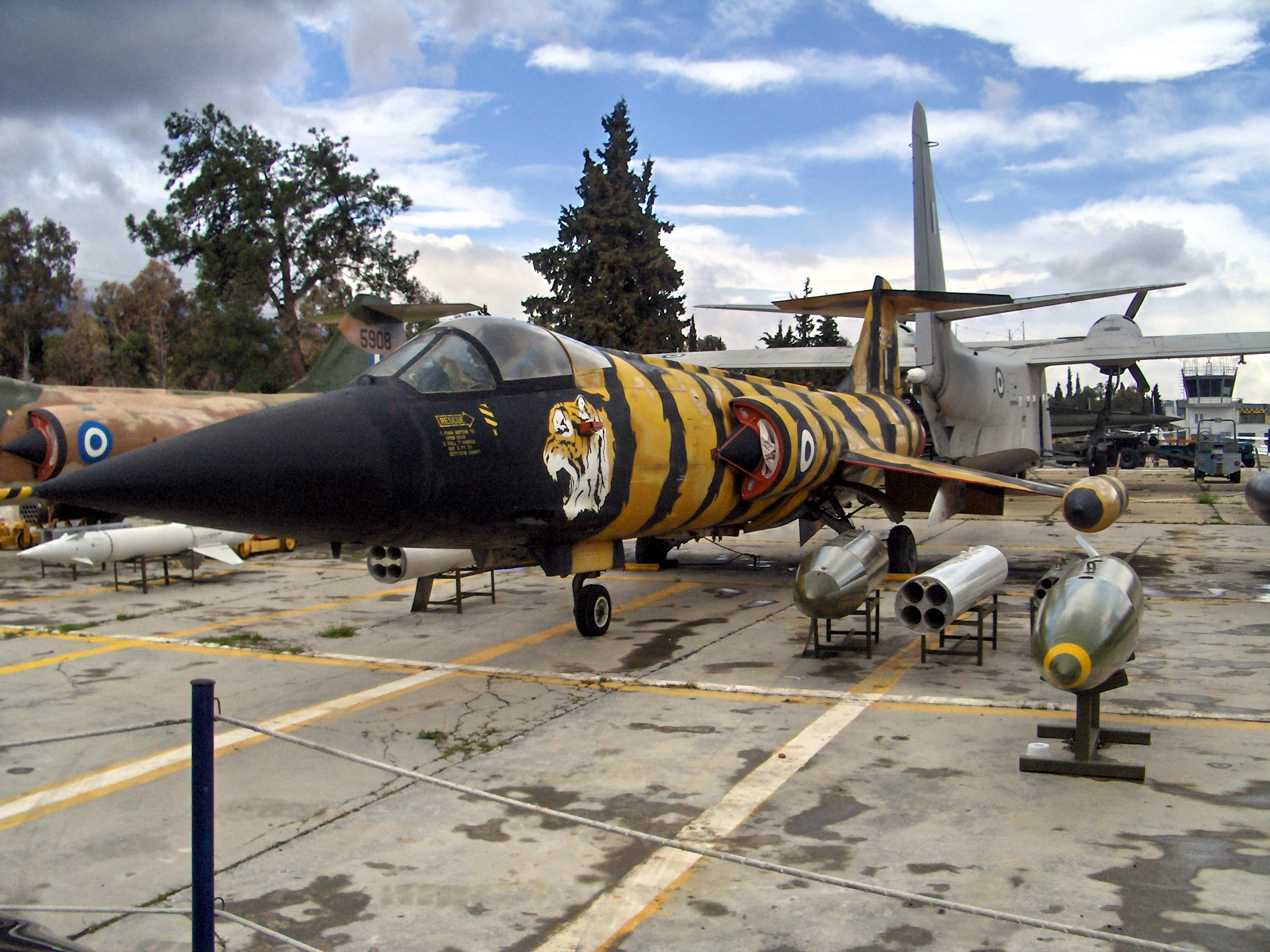
HAF F-104G from 335 Squadron, painted in a "Tiger" scheme.

Greece received 45 new-built F-104G and six TF-104s under the Military Assistance Program. These were supplemented by second-hand Starfighters passed on from other NATO air forces, including 79 from Germany, seven from the Netherlands and nine from Spain. The Starfighter entered Greek service in April 1964, equipping two wings, leaving service in March 1993.

Greek Air Force

- 335 Moira "Tigris" based at Tanagra / Araxos
- 336 Moira "Olympos" based at Tanagra / Araxos

=== Italy ===
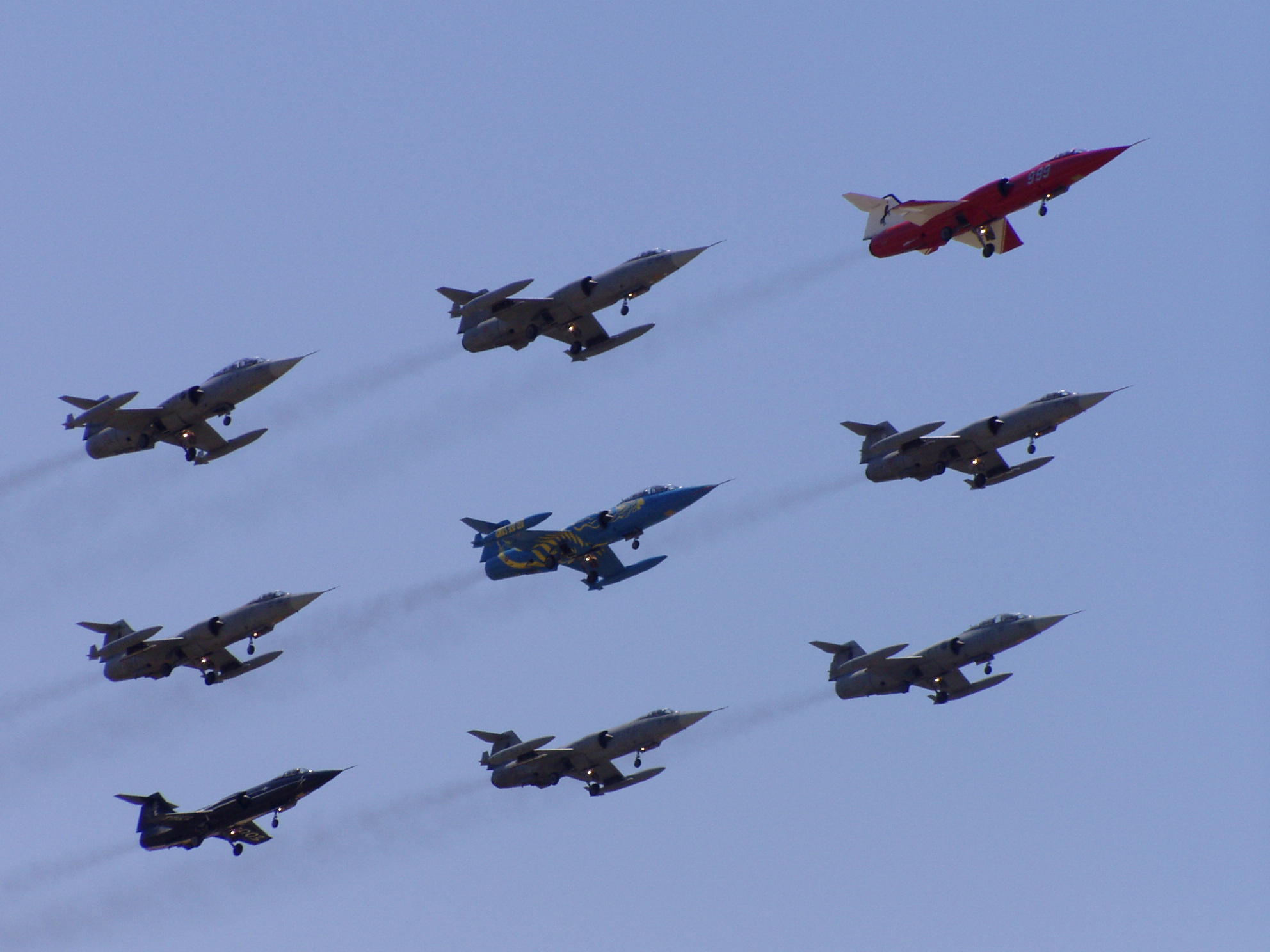
A formation of Italian F-104Ss.

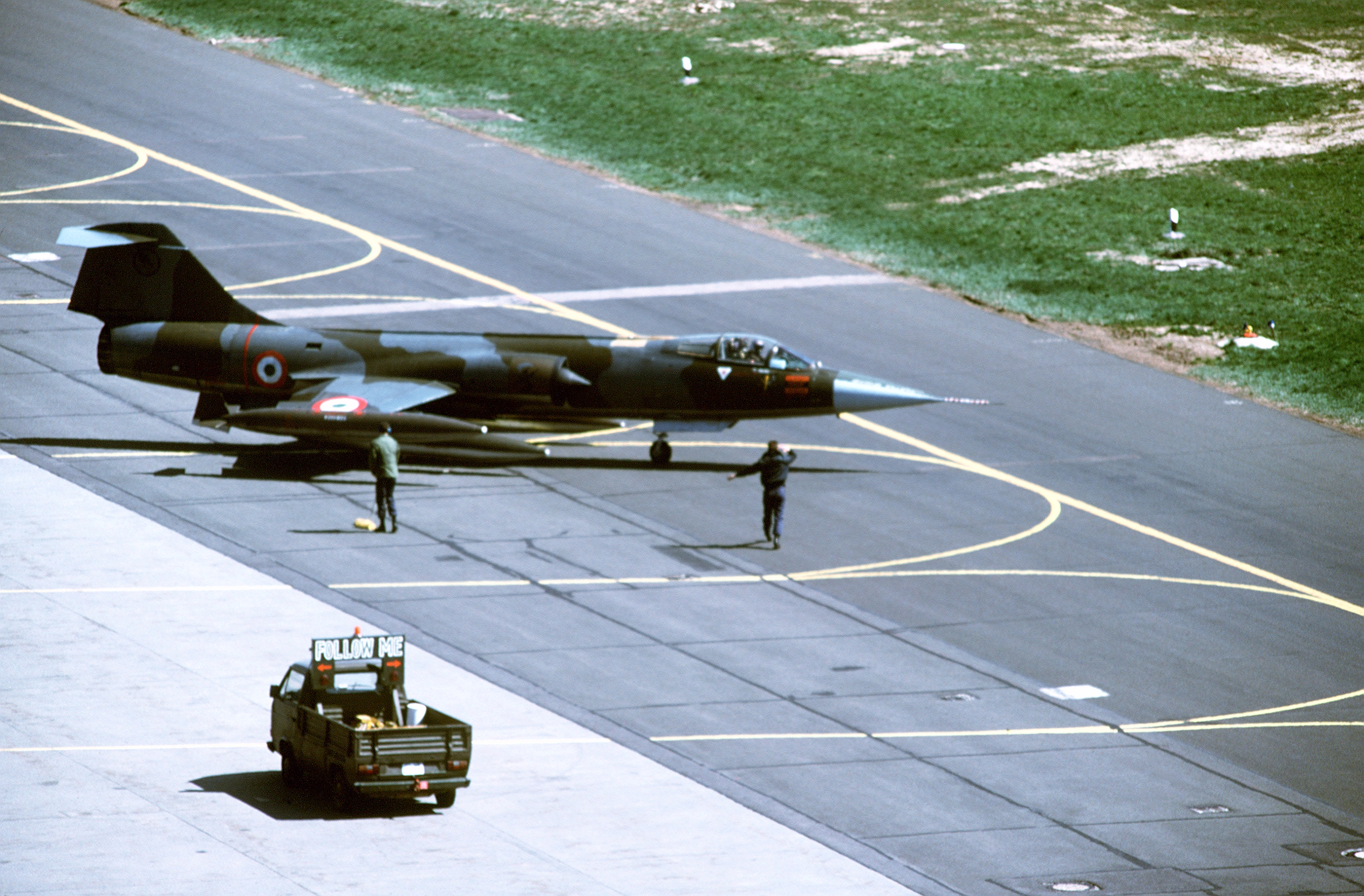
An Italian F-104S at Bitburg Air Base, 1988.

In the Italian Air Force, the F-104 was a mainstay from the early 1960s until the end of the 20th century. The first flight for an Italian F-104G was a Lockheed-built aircraft, MM6501, on 9 June 1962; however, the first Fiat/Aeritalia-built example flew two years later on 5 October 1962. Italy initially received a total of 105 F-104G, 24 TF-104G and 20 RF-104Gs, becoming operational in March 1963. This fleet was later increased by the addition of 205 built under license by Aeritalia F-104S aircraft and six ex-Luftwaffe TF-104Gs bringing the total number of aircraft operated to 360. In 1986 the AMI was the largest operator with eleven units flying the Starfighter operationally. Up to 1997, Italy lost 137 (38%) of its F-104s in 928,000 flying hours (14.7 aircraft every 100,000 hrs). The F-104 was officially retired from AMI service during a large ceremony at Pratica di Mare in 2004.

Aeronautica Militare Italiana

- 3° Stormo based at Villafranca
  - 28° Gruppo (Reconnaissance)
  - 132° Gruppo (Reconnaissance)
- 4° Stormo based at Grosseto
  - 9° Gruppo (Interception)
  - 20° Gruppo (Operational Conversion)
- 5° Stormo based at Rimini
  - 23° Gruppo (Interception)
  - 102° Gruppo (Fighter/Bomber)
- 6° Stormo based at Ghedi
  - 154° Gruppo (Fighter/Bomber)
  - 155° Gruppo (Fighter/Bomber)
- 9° Stormo based at Grazzanise
  - 10° Gruppo (Interception)
- 36° Stormo based at Gioia del Colle
  - 12° Gruppo (Interception)
  - 156° Gruppo (Fighter/Bomber)
- 37° Stormo based at Trapani
  - 18° Gruppo (Interception & Fighter/Bomber)
- 51° Stormo based at Treviso / Istrana
  - 22° Gruppo (Interception)
- 53° Stormo based at Cameri / Novara
  - 21° Gruppo (Interception)

=== Japan ===
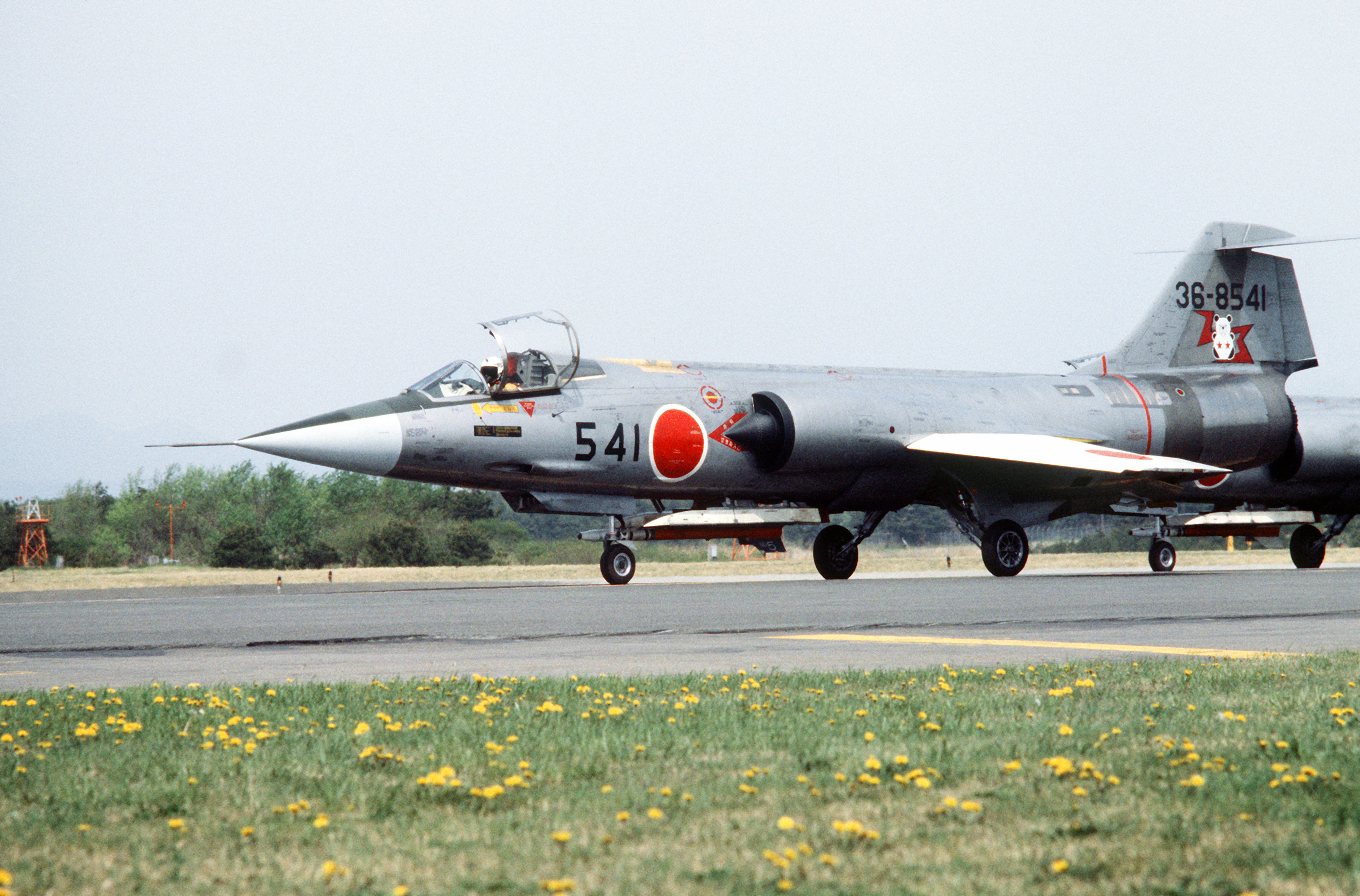
A JASDF F-104J in 1982.

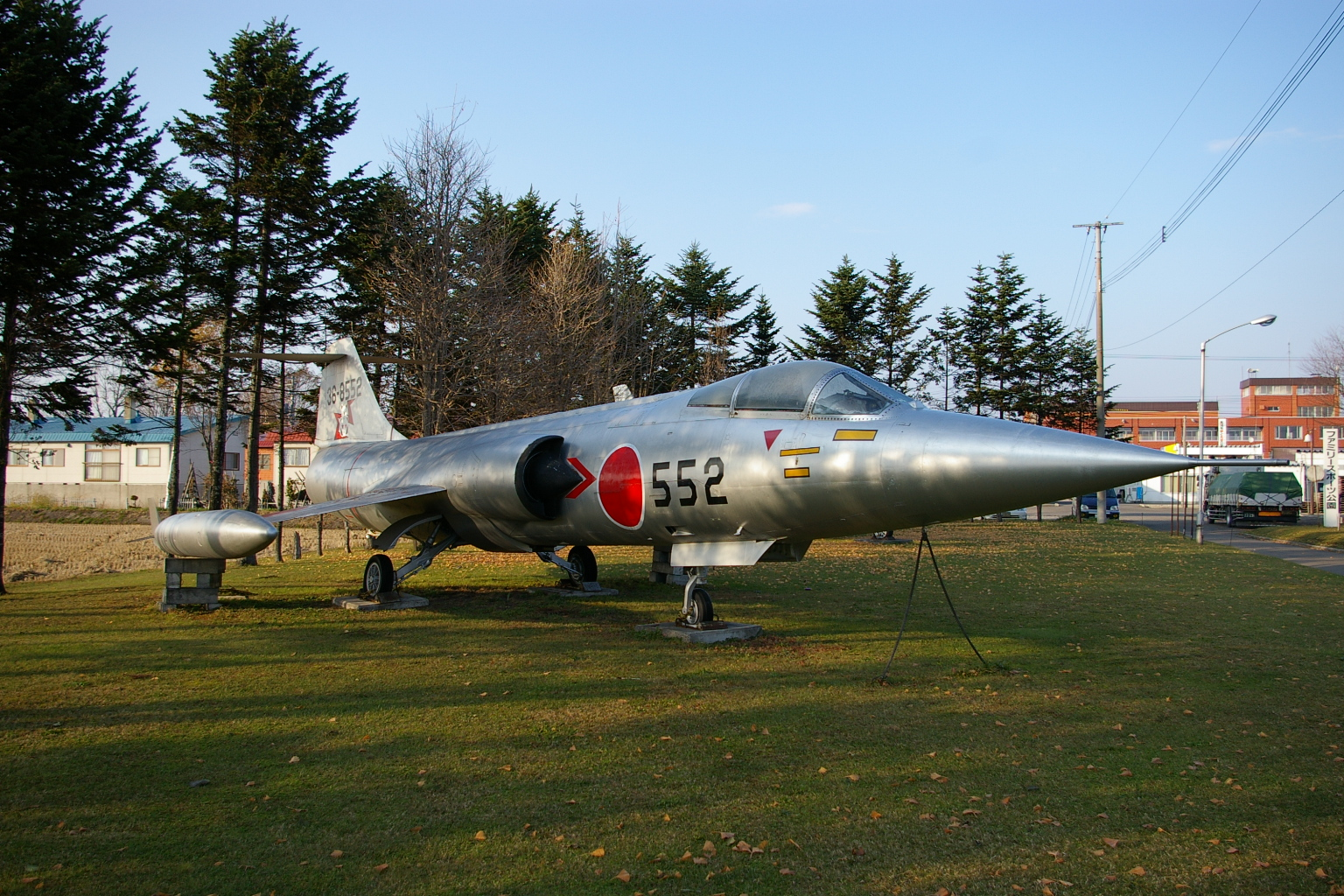
JASDF F-104J exhibited near Hokkaido Chippubetsu city in 2006.

The JASDF operated 210 F-104J air-superiority fighters and 20 dual-control trainer F-104DJs. Called Eiko ("Glory"), they served from October 1962 to 1986, losing only 3 airplanes in this time including a mid-air collision accident. Seven air-superiority squadrons used them: 201, 202, 203, 204, 205, 206, 207. Japanese F-104s faced intrusive Soviet airplanes during this long service. Twenty two of the Japanese F-104s were eventually converted to drones for aerial target practice. 31 F-104J and five F-104DJ aircraft were sold to Taiwan.

Japan Air Self-Defense Force

- 2nd Kokudan based at Chitose Air Base (201st) and Komatsu Air Base (203rd)
  - 201st Tactical Fighter Squadron
  - 203rd Tactical Fighter Squadron
- 5th Kokudan based at Nyutabaru Air Base (202nd) and Tsuiki Air Base (204th)
  - 202nd Tactical Fighter Squadron
  - 204th Tactical Fighter Squadron
- 6th Kokudan based at Komatsu Air Base
  - 205th Tactical Fighter Squadron
- 7th Air Wing based at Hyakuri Air Base, part at Naha Air Base
  - 206th Tactical Fighter Squadron
  - 207th Tactical Fighter Squadron

=== Jordan ===
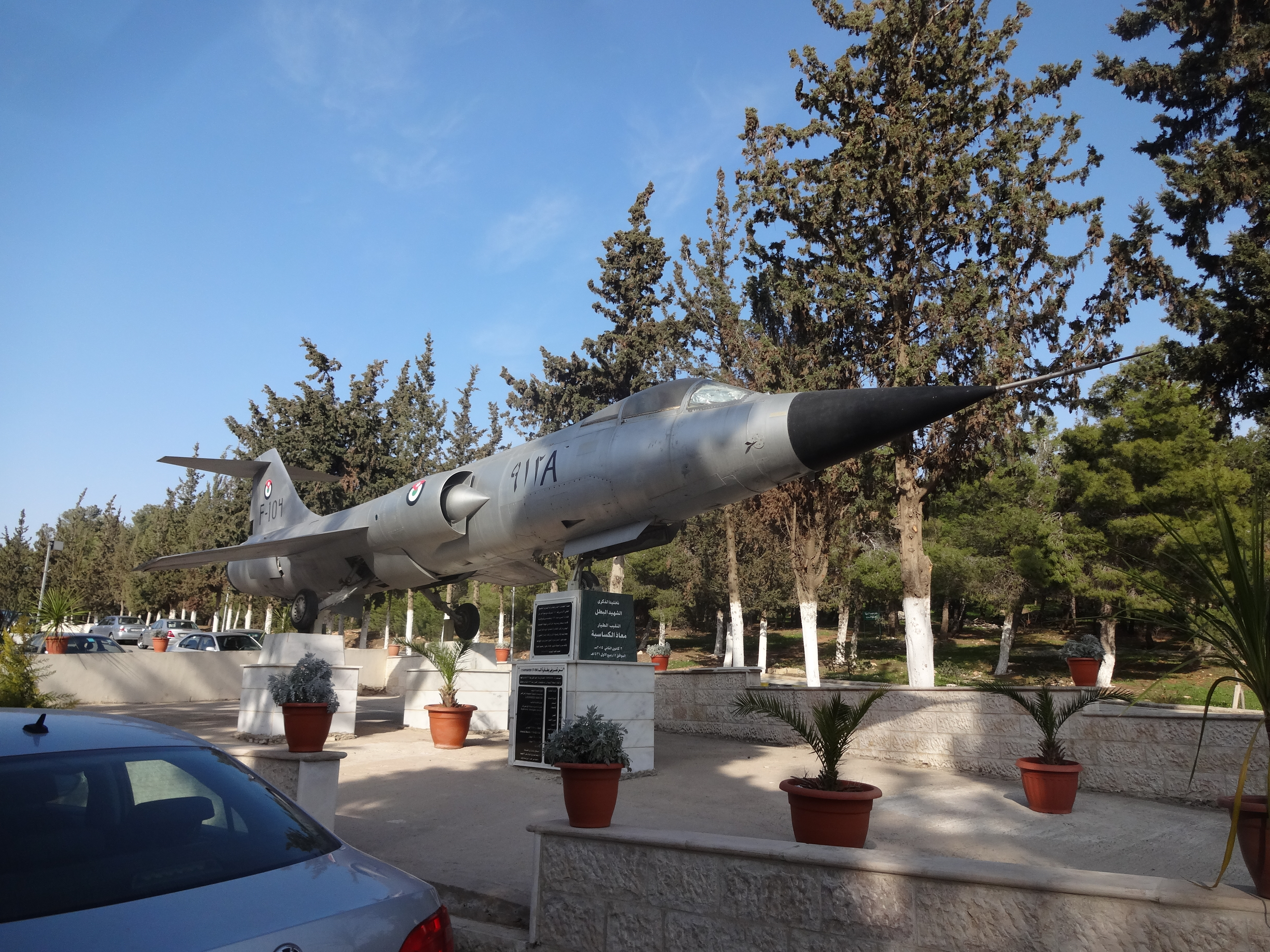
Jordan F-104 at the Moath Kasasbeh memorial

Jordan received 29 F-104A and four F-104B aircraft delivered under the Military Assistance Program in 1967. Controlled by the United States these aircraft were moved temporarily to Turkey during the Arab–Israeli Six-Day War. Replaced by the Northrop F-5 and Dassault Mirage F1 by 1983, the survivors serve as airfield decoys.

Royal Jordanian Air Force

- No. 9 Squadron RJAF based at Prince Hassan Air Base, ceased flying F-104 in 1977.
- No. 25 Squadron RJAF based at Mwaffaq Salti

=== Netherlands ===
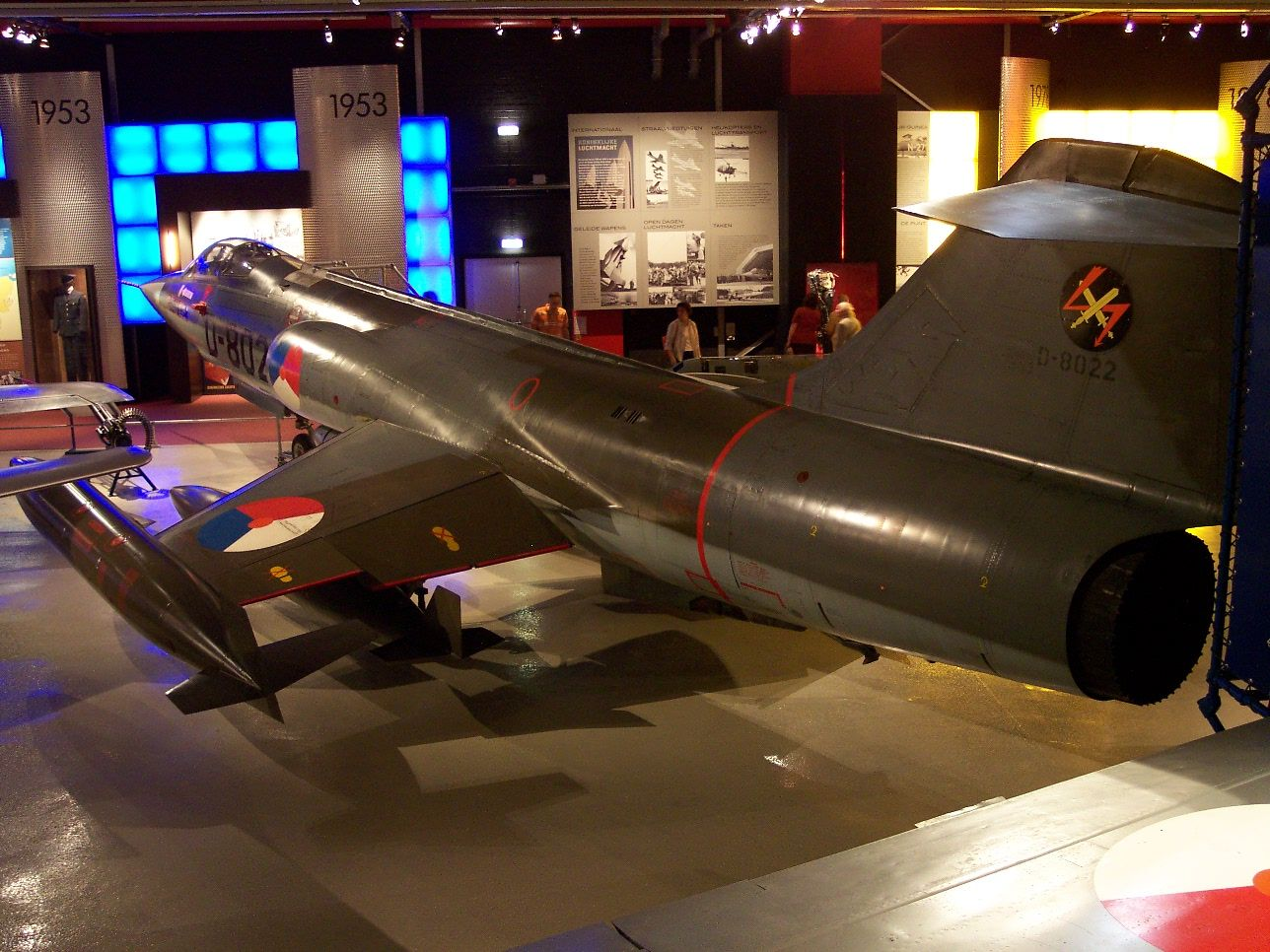
Dutch F-104 displayed in the Militaire Luchtvaart Museum Soesterberg (Netherlands)

The Netherlands operated European-built F-104s with the exception of the TF-104G. These were delivered directly from Palmdale to the KLu. A total of 138 Starfighters were delivered to the Koninklijke Luchtmacht (Royal Netherlands Air Force, or KLu). Many Dutch aircraft were transferred to Turkey.

Royal Netherlands Air Force

- Volkel air base
  - 306 Squadron RNLAF (Reconnaissance)
  - 311 Squadron RNLAF (Fighter/Bomber)
  - 312 Squadron RNLAF (Fighter/Bomber)
- Leeuwarden air base
  - 322 Squadron RNLAF (Interception)
  - 323 Squadron RNLAF (Interception)
- Training and Conversion Unit A, RNLAF
- Conversie Afdeling Volkel

=== Norway ===
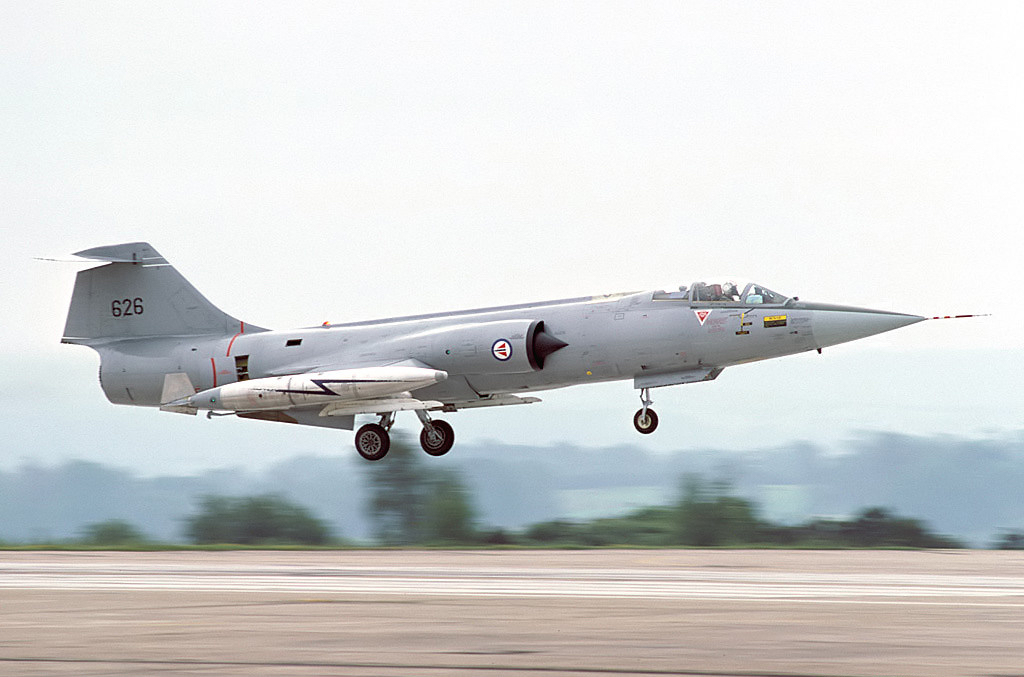
Royal Norwegian Air Force Lockheed RF-104G Starfighter

Norway received 18 surplus CF-104s and four CF-104Ds from Canada in 1974, the country had initially received 19 Canadair built F-104Gs and four TF-104Gs in 1963 under the Military Assistance Program. The F-104 was phased out of Norwegian service in winter 1982.

Royal Norwegian Air Force

- 331 Squadron based at Bodø
- 334 Squadron based at Bodø

=== Pakistan ===
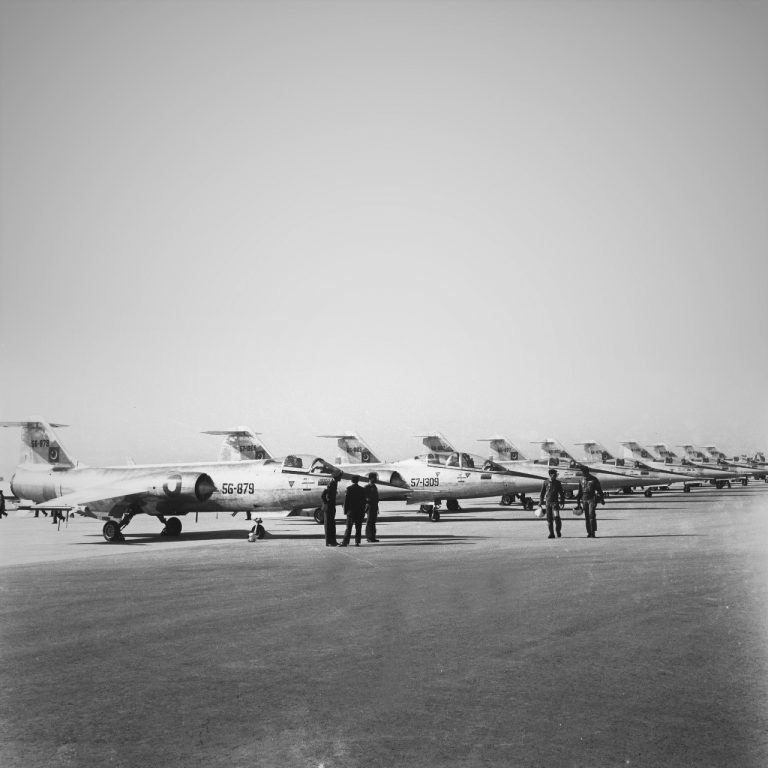
Pakistani Griffin F-104As and F-104Bs lined up on the tarmac at Sargodha AFB.

Pakistan was the first Major non-NATO Ally to be equipped with the F-104, a total of 12 F-104A and 2 F-104B were delivered; nine F-104A (tail numbers 56-803, 56-804, 56-805, 56-807, 56-868, 56-874, 56-875, 56-877, 56-879) and two F-104B (tail numbers 57-1309, 57-1312) on 5 August 1961, although some sources say the first two were landed at Sargodha Airbase (now Mushaf Airbase) by Sqn Ldr Sadruddin and Flt Lt Middlecoat in 1962. One more F-104A was delivered on 8 June 1964 (tail number 56-773) and another on 1 March 1965 (tail number 56-798) as replacements for the lost starfighters in accidents. Pakistani starfighters were ex-USAF Air Defence Command aircraft retro-fitted with the more powerful General Electric J-79-11A engines and, at the PAF's request, the 20 mm Vulcan gatling gun was re-installed after removal by the USAF. These F-104s had unusually high thrust to weight ratios due to the older but lighter airframe and more modern engines. The F-104 was in service for 12 years with 11,690 flight hours, 246 hours 45 minutes of these in the 1965 Indo-Pakistan War and 103 hours 45 minutes in the 1971 Indo-Pakistan War, after which five F-104 remained and were grounded by lack of spares due to post war U.S. sanctions. The type was phased out in late 1972.

Pakistan Air Force

- Central Air Command
  - No. 38 Multi-Role Wing based at Sargodha AFB
    - No. 9 Squadron "Griffins"

=== Spain ===
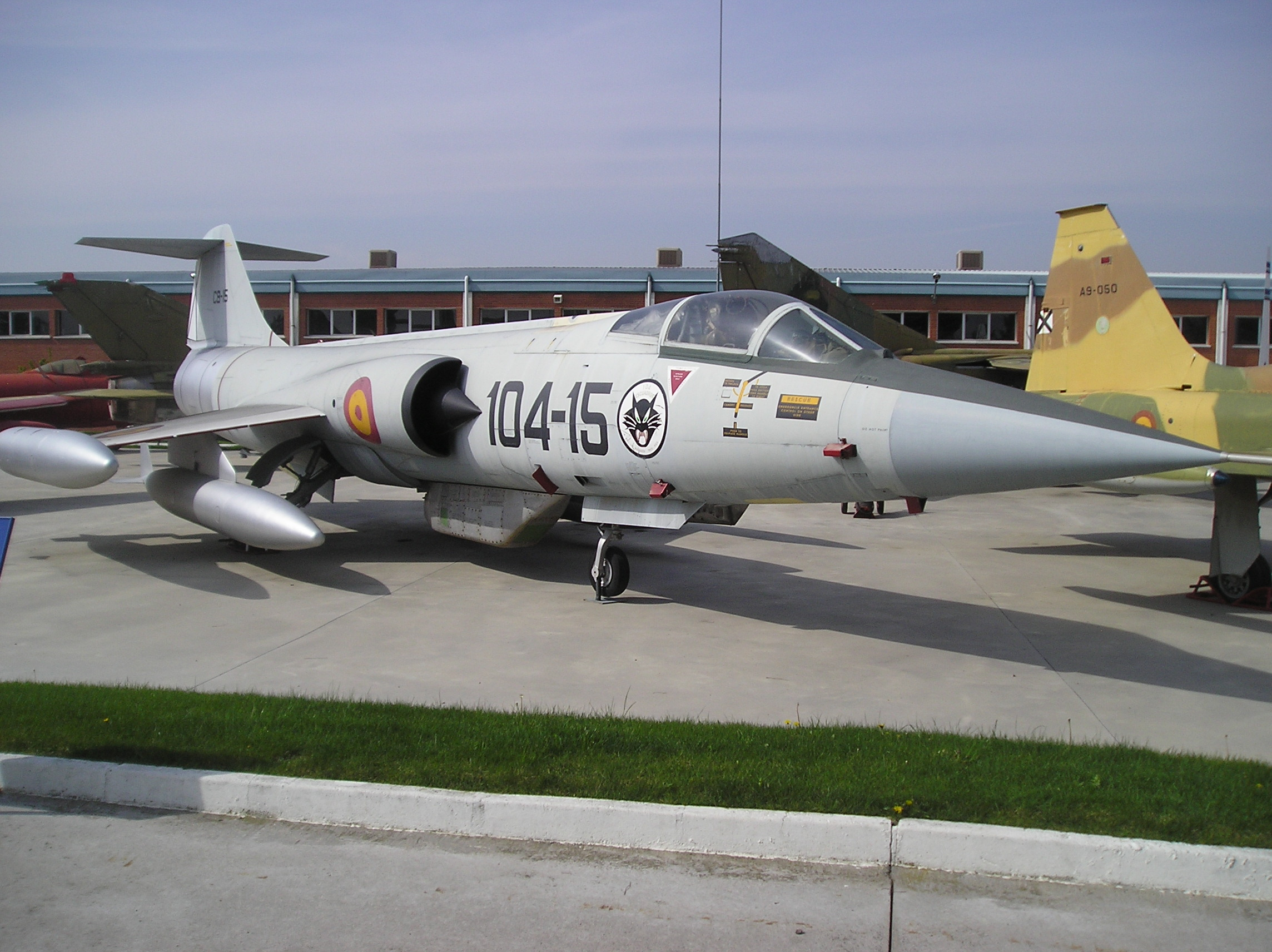
Spanish F-104G Starfighter.

The Spanish Air Force received their F-104s under the Military Assistance Program: 18 Canadair-built F-104Gs and three Lockheed-built TF-104Gs were delivered under MAP to Spain's Ejército del Aire in 1965. These aircraft were transferred to Greece and Turkey when they were replaced by F-4 Phantoms in 1972. It is notable that no aircraft were lost through accidents during 17,000 hours of operational use in Spain although the aircraft was used only in its intended role of an interceptor and mainly in very good flying weather.

Ejército del Aire

- Ala 6 based at Torrejon (later redesignated Ala 16)
  - 61 Escuadron (later redesignated 161 Escuadron and 104 Escuadron)

=== Taiwan (Republic of China) ===
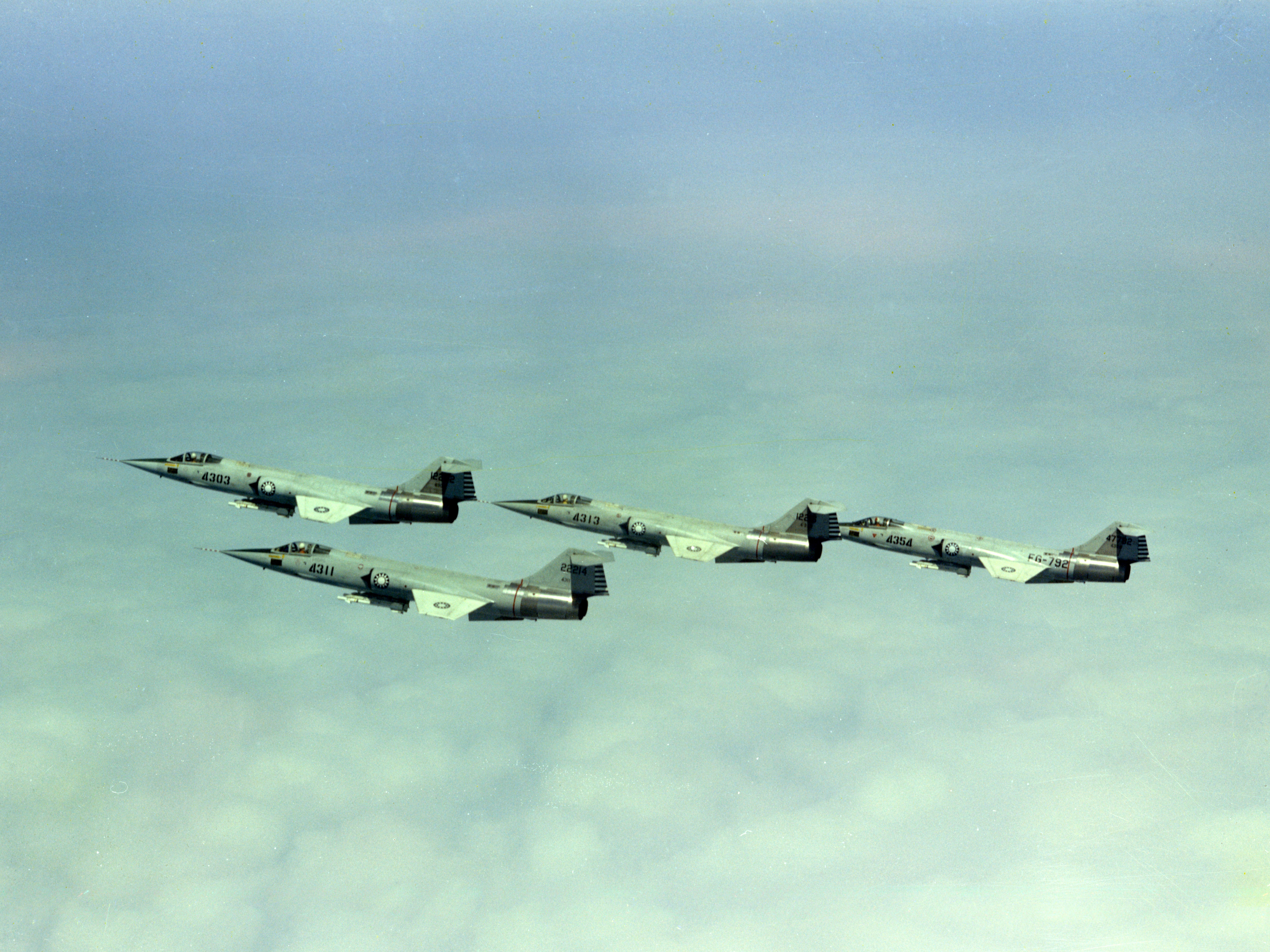
ROCAF F-104G, in 1969.

ROC operated a total of 282 aircraft funded by the Military Assistance Program (MAP); a mixture of new-build and surplus F-104A, -B, -D, -G, -J, -DJ, RF-104G, and TF-104G were used. The Starfighter was phased out of Taiwanese service by 1997.

Republic of China Air Force

- 427th Tactical Fighter Wing, ROCAF based Ching Chuang Kang AB
  - 7th Tactical Fighter Squadron, ROCAF
  - 8th Tactical Fighter Squadron, ROCAF
  - 28th Tactical Fighter Squadron, ROCAF
  - 35th Tactical Fighter Squadron, ROCAF
- 499th Tactical Fighter Wing, ROCAF based at Hsinchu AB
  - 41st Tactical Fighter Squadron, ROCAF
  - 42nd Tactical Fighter Squadron, ROCAF
  - 48th Tactical Fighter Squadron, ROCAF
- 401st Tactical Combined Wing, ROCAF based at Taoyuan AB
  - 12th Tactical Reconnaissance Squadron

=== Turkey ===
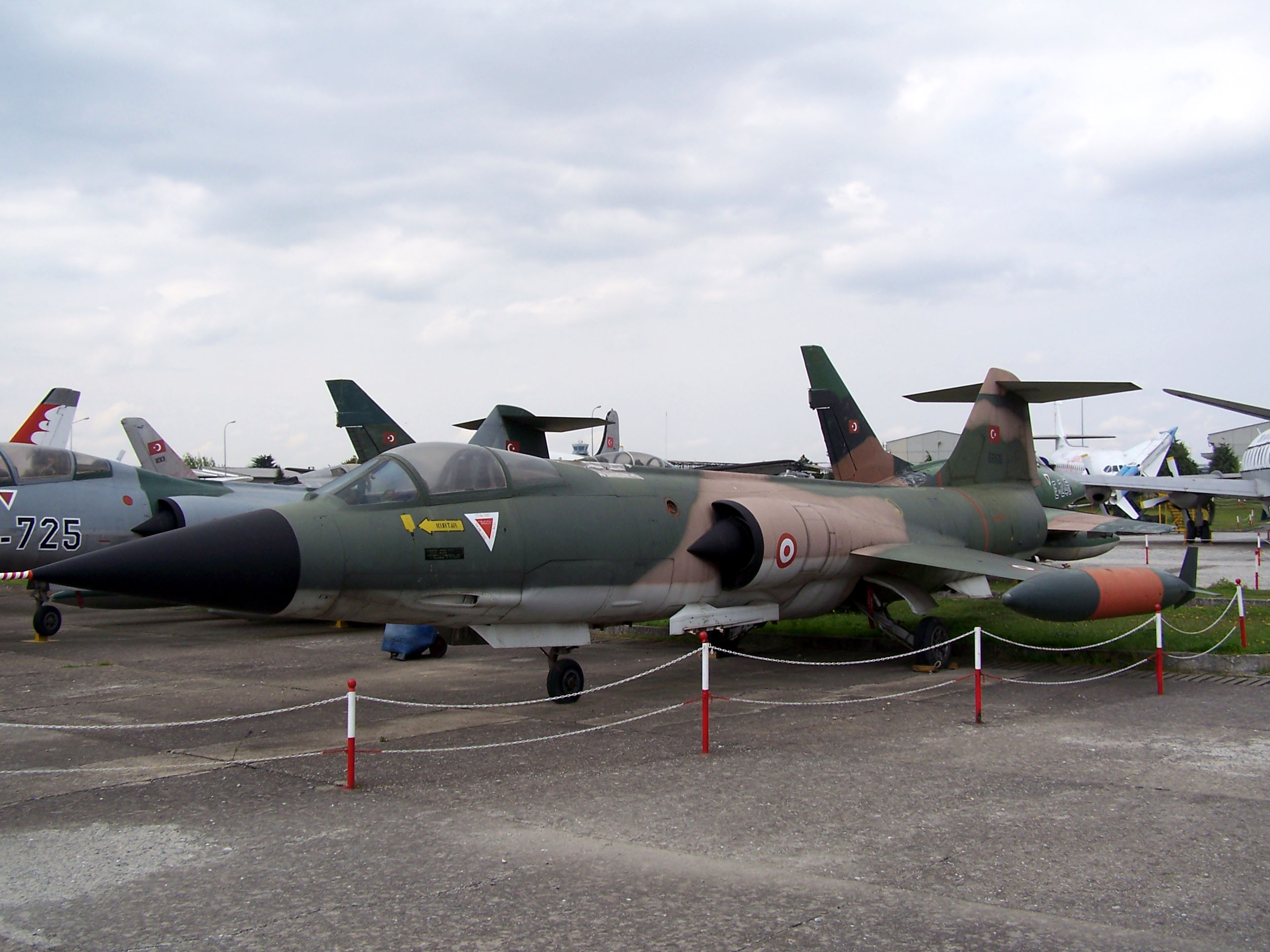
Aeritalia F-104 S Star Fighter in Istanbul Aviation Museumin.

Turkey received 48 new-build F-104Gs and six TF-104Gs from Lockheed and Canadair production, funded under the Military Assistance Program, which were delivered from 1963, and directly purchased 40 new F-104S interceptors from Fiat in 1974–75. In addition, like Greece, Turkey received large numbers of surplus Starfighters from several NATO nations in the 1970s and 1980s, including 170 ex-German aircraft, 53 aircraft from the Netherlands and 52 from Canada. In total, Turkey received over 400 Starfighters from various sources, although many of these aircraft were broken up for spares without having been flown. The F-104 was finally retired from Turkish service in 1995.

Turkish Air Force

- 4 Ana Jet Us based at Akıncı Air Base
  - 141 Filo
  - 142 Filo
  - Öncel Filo
- 6 Ana Jet Us based at Bandirma
  - 161 Filo
  - 162 Filo
- 8 Ana Jet Us based at Diyarbakir
  - 181 Filo
  - 182 Filo
- 9 Ana Jet Us based at Balikesir
  - 191 Filo
  - 192 Filo
  - 193 Filo

=== United States ===
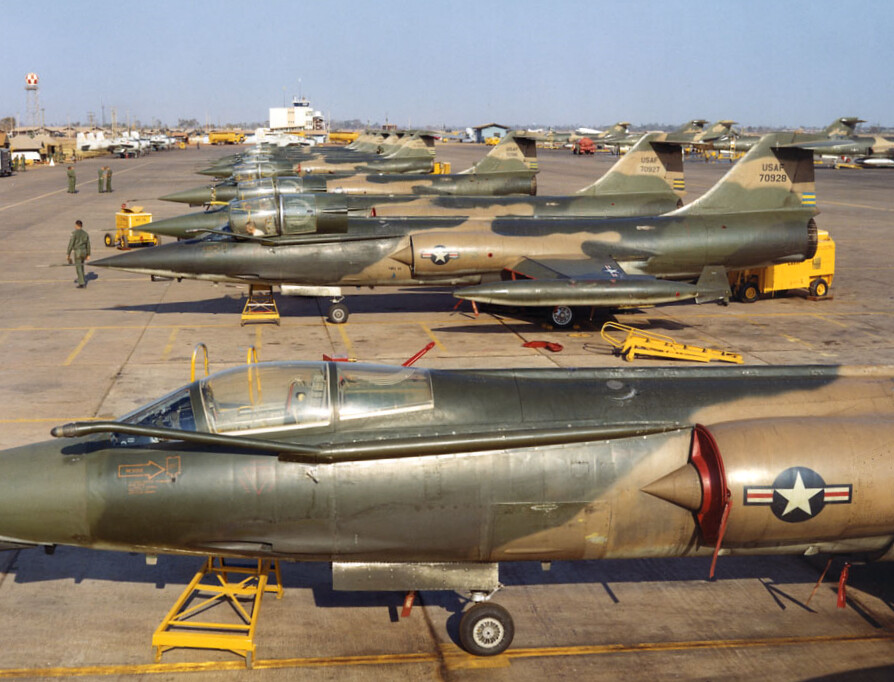
USAF 476th TFS F-104Cs in Vietnam, 1965.

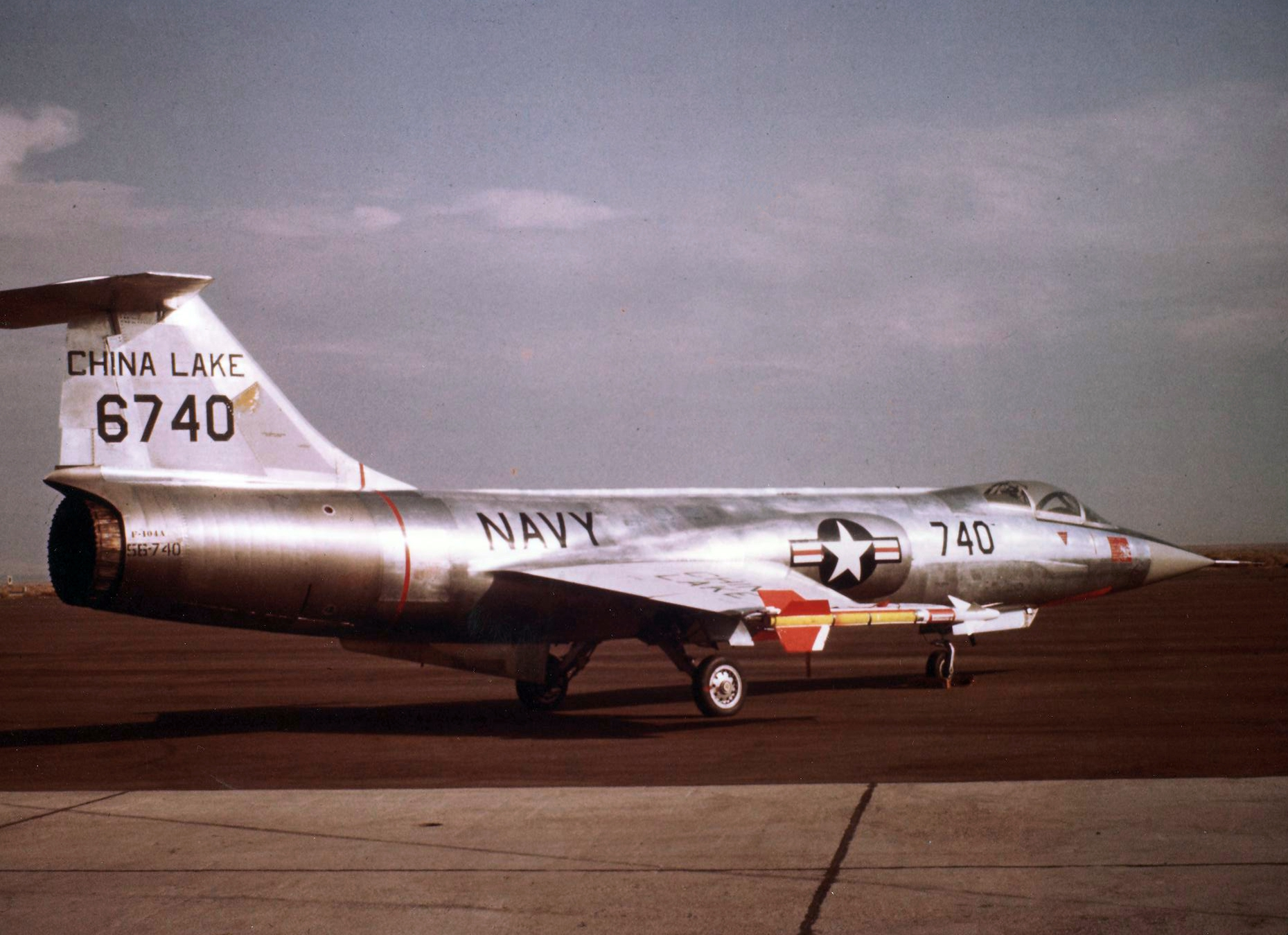
USN F-104A at NWTC China Lake, 1960

United States Air Force

Air Force Systems Command

- U.S. Air Force Aerospace Research Pilot School (ARPS) based at Edwards AFB, California

Tactical Air Command

- 479th Tactical Fighter Wing based at George AFB, California
  - 434th Tactical Fighter Squadron
  - 435th Tactical Fighter Squadron
  - 436th Tactical Fighter Squadron
  - 476th Tactical Fighter Squadron

Air Defense Command / Aerospace Defense Command

- 56th Fighter-Interceptor Squadron based at Wright-Patterson AFB, Ohio
- 83d Fighter Interceptor Squadron based at Hamilton AFB, California
- 337th Fighter Interceptor Squadron based at Westover AFB, Massachusetts
- 538th Fighter-Interceptor Squadron based at Larson AFB, Washington
- 319th Fighter-Interceptor Squadron based at Homestead AFB, Florida
- 331st Fighter-Interceptor Squadron based at Webb AFB, Texas

Air National Guard

- 161st Fighter Interceptor Group, Arizona Air National Guard based at Goldwater ANGB/Sky Harbor International Airport, Arizona
  - 197th Fighter Interceptor Squadron
- 156th Fighter Group, Puerto Rico Air National Guard based at Muñiz Air National Guard Base, Puerto Rico
  - 198th Tactical Fighter Squadron
- 169th Fighter Interceptor Group, South Carolina Air National Guard based at McEntire ANGS, South Carolina
  - 157th Fighter Interceptor Squadron
- 134th Fighter Interceptor Group, Tennessee Air National Guard based at McGhee Tyson ANGB, Tennessee
  - 151st Fighter Interceptor Squadron

United States Navy

- Navy Weapons Training Center China Lake, California

== Civil operators ==
=== United States ===
NASA

Eleven F-104s (different versions) were operated by NASA between 1956 and 1994. Aircraft were used in support of the X-15 and XB-70 flight testing and were also used for astronaut training during various spaceflight programs. NASA F-104 aircraft were used to gather flight research data including aircraft handling characteristics, such as roll inertia coupling, and reaction control systems as used in the NF-104A and X-15. Space Shuttle thermal protection tiles were tested in flights aboard a Starfighter on a rig which simulated flight through rain. NASA's Starfighters flew many safety chase sorties in support of advanced research aircraft over the years, including the wingless lifting body aircraft. Neil Armstrong was one notable pilot who flew a NASA F-104.

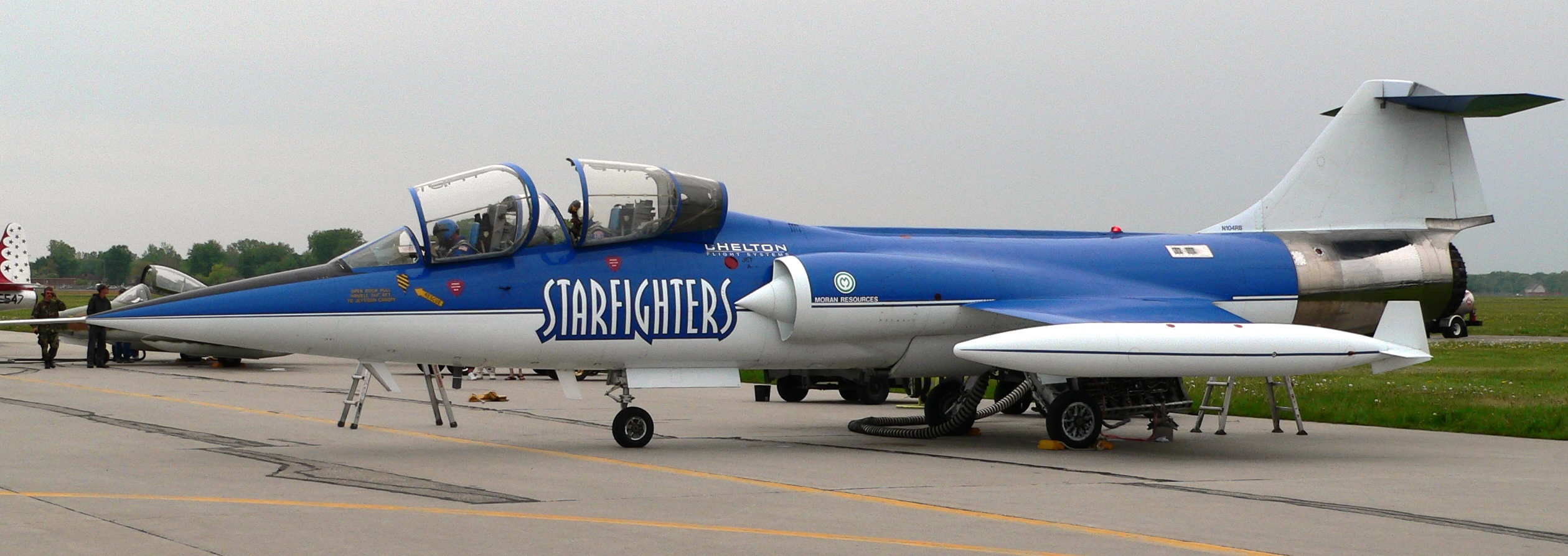
The "Starfighters" prepare for a demonstration.

The Starfighters F-104 Demo Team

The team based in Clearwater, Florida currently operate three Canadair CF-104 Starfighters, performing at air shows across the United States and Canada. Their CF-104s consist of a two-seat CF-104D Serial#:104632 (registered as N104RB), and two single-seat CF-104s Serial#s: 104850 (registered as N104RD) and 104759 (registered as N104RN). The aircraft were originally operated with the Royal Canadian Air Force and all later served with the Royal Norwegian Air Force before being imported into the U.S. in the early 1990s.

F-104RB "Red Baron"

Another civilian Starfighter, called the F-104RB (for Manfred von Richthofen, the "Red Baron"), was used to set the low-level speed record in October 1977 by world-famous air racer Darryl Greenamyer. Greenamyer built his F-104 over a period of 12 years from parts scrounged from various places, including a "borrowed" J79-17/1 turbojet from a McDonnell Douglas F-4 Phantom, which developed over 2,000 pounds more thrust than the standard J79-19 engine. Greenamyer attacked the record at Mud Lake, near Tonapah, Nevada, and beat the previous low-level speed record by recording a top speed of 988.26 mph (1,590.41 km/h) after five passes over the dry lake. He remained supersonic for most of the 20-minute flight, and rarely rose much higher than 100 feet above the lake bed. Several months later, while practicing for an attempt on the world absolute altitude record, he was forced to eject when his landing gear failed to extend; a belly landing in the F-104 was considered too dangerous to attempt.

== Summary of production by country ==
Source: F-104 Starfighter in action

	Operated	Lockheed	Canada	Germany	Netherlands	Belgium	Italy	Japan
USAF	297	297						
USAF/MAP	250	110	140					
Canada	238	38	200					
Japan	230	23						207
Germany	917	240		283	255	89	50	
Netherlands	138	14			99		25	
Belgium	112	3				109		
Italy	354	12					342	
subtotals	Grand: 2536	737	340	283	354	198	417	207

== See also ==
- Canadair CF-104
- CL-1200 Lancer and X-27
- Lockheed NF-104A
- Mutual Defense Assistance Act (Military Assistance Program)
