= Fritz Wendel =

German test pilot (1915–1975)

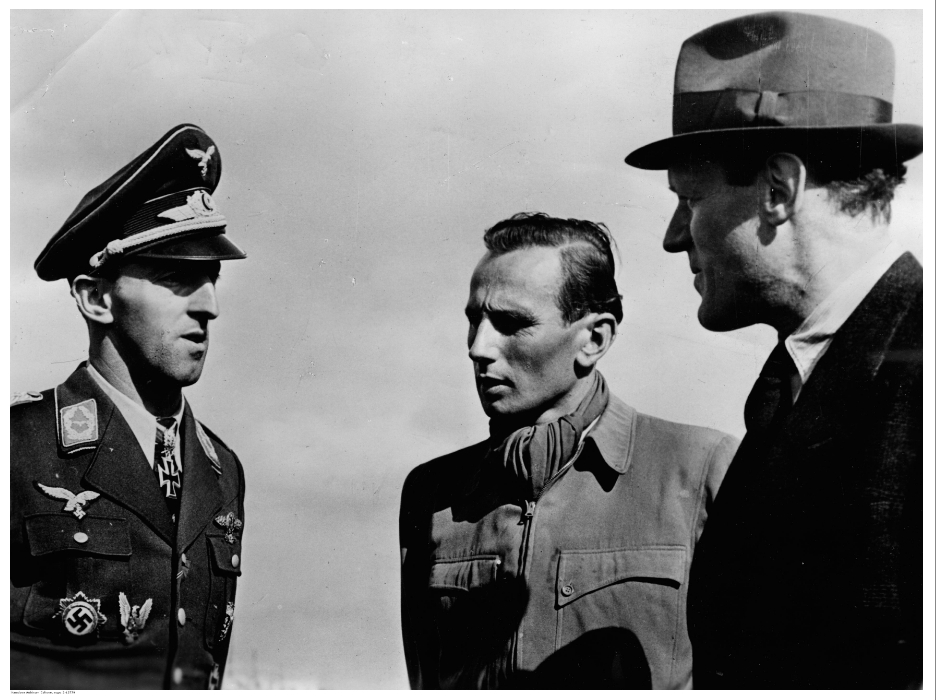
- Fritz Wendel (center) with Hermann Graf (left) and Willy Messerschmitt (right)
- Born: 21 February 1915
- Died: 9 February 1975 (aged 59); Augsburg
- Military career
- Allegiance: Nazi Germany
- Branch: Luftwaffe

Friedrich "Fritz" Wendel (21 February 1915 – 9 February 1975) was a German test pilot during the 1930s and 1940s.

== Achievements ==
On 26 April 1939 Fritz Wendel set the world air speed record of 755.138 km/h (469.221 mph), flying the Messerschmitt Me 209 V1. He broke the record set on 30 March 1939 by Hans Dieterle flying the Heinkel He 100 V8. Wendel's record stood for 30 years, until broken by Darryl Greenamyer in 1969.

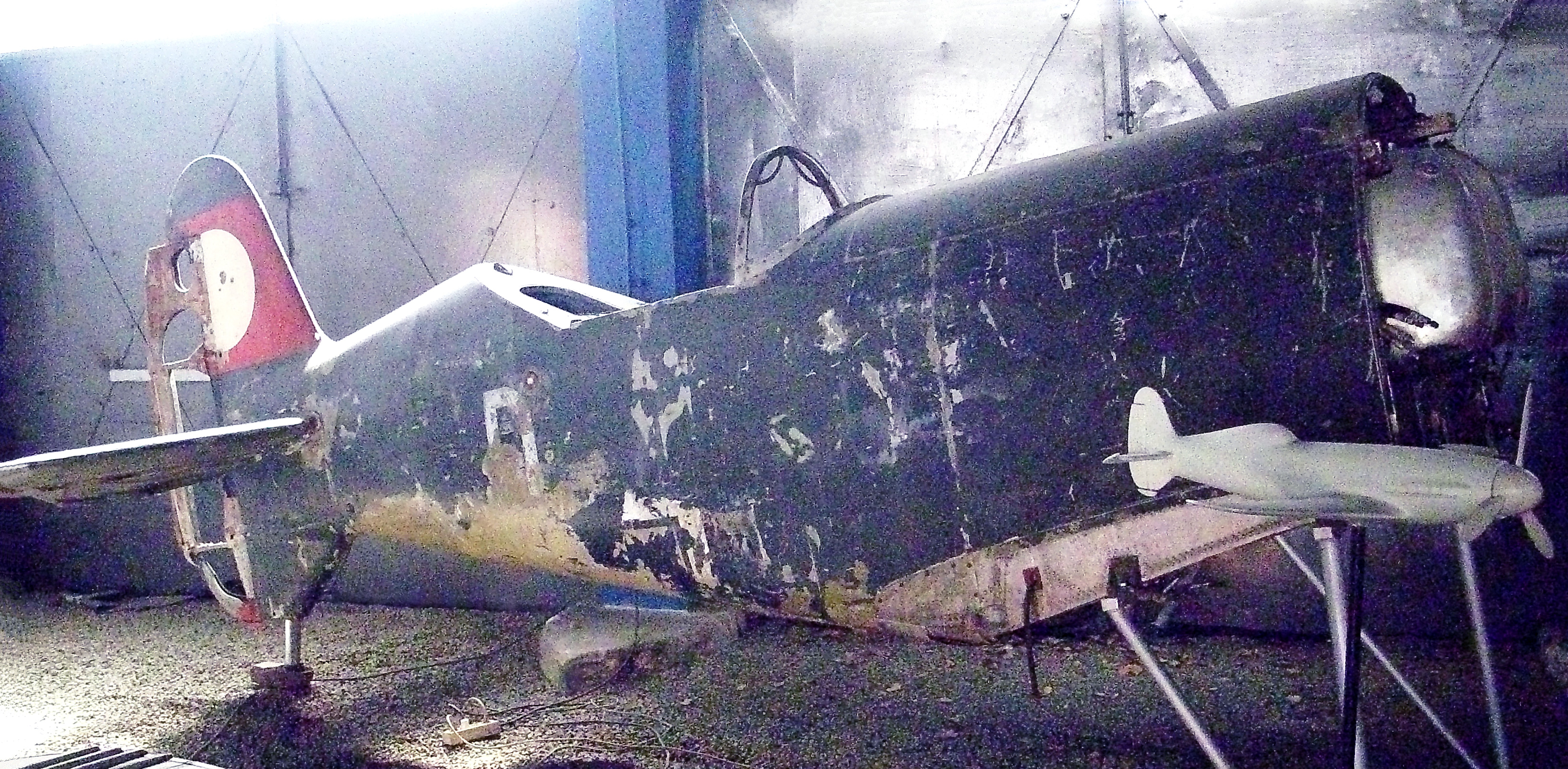
The Me 209 V1's fuselage relic in Kraków, Poland

The relic fuselage of the Me 209 V1 still exists in the Polish Air Museum at Kraków.

On 18 July 1942 in Leipheim near Günzburg, Nazi Germany, Wendel test flew the "V3" third prototype of the Messerschmitt Me 262 jet-powered combat aircraft design. This flight was significant as it was conducted with twin Junkers Jumo 004 jet engines for the first time. The earlier-built Me 262 V1 had flown first on 8 April 1941 with a nose-mounted piston engine.

== Emergencies ==
On 5 September 1940, Flugkapitän Wendel, while performing a series of diving trials on Me 210 V2, Werknummer 0002, WL-ABEO, lost the starboard tailplane in the final dive and bailed out, the twin-engined fighter crashing in the Siebentíschwald, a section of municipal forest in Augsburg, Germany. This was the first of many losses of the type.

On 25 March 1942, Wendel took the first prototype Me 262V1, PC+UA, on its first jet-powered flight but the experimental BMW 003 gas turbojet engines it was fitted with both failed and he was forced to limp the prototype airframe back to Augsburg on the nose-mounted Jumo 210 inverted-V12 piston engine installed for initial airframe testing.

Wendel worked for Messerschmitt until the collapse of Nazi Germany in 1945.

== Later life ==
After the war Wendel became director of a local brewery but continued flying sports planes until a circulatory ailment forced him out of the cockpit. A few days before his death he was released from hospital where he underwent treatment for the circulatory condition.

Wendel was found dead at his home in Augsburg, Germany, on Sunday 9 February 1975 with a hunting rifle at his side. Police said that relatives found his body but could not rule immediately whether his death was suicide or an accident. He was 59.

Wendel was survived by his wife and a 21-year-old son.
