= Zoom climb =

Flight maneuver

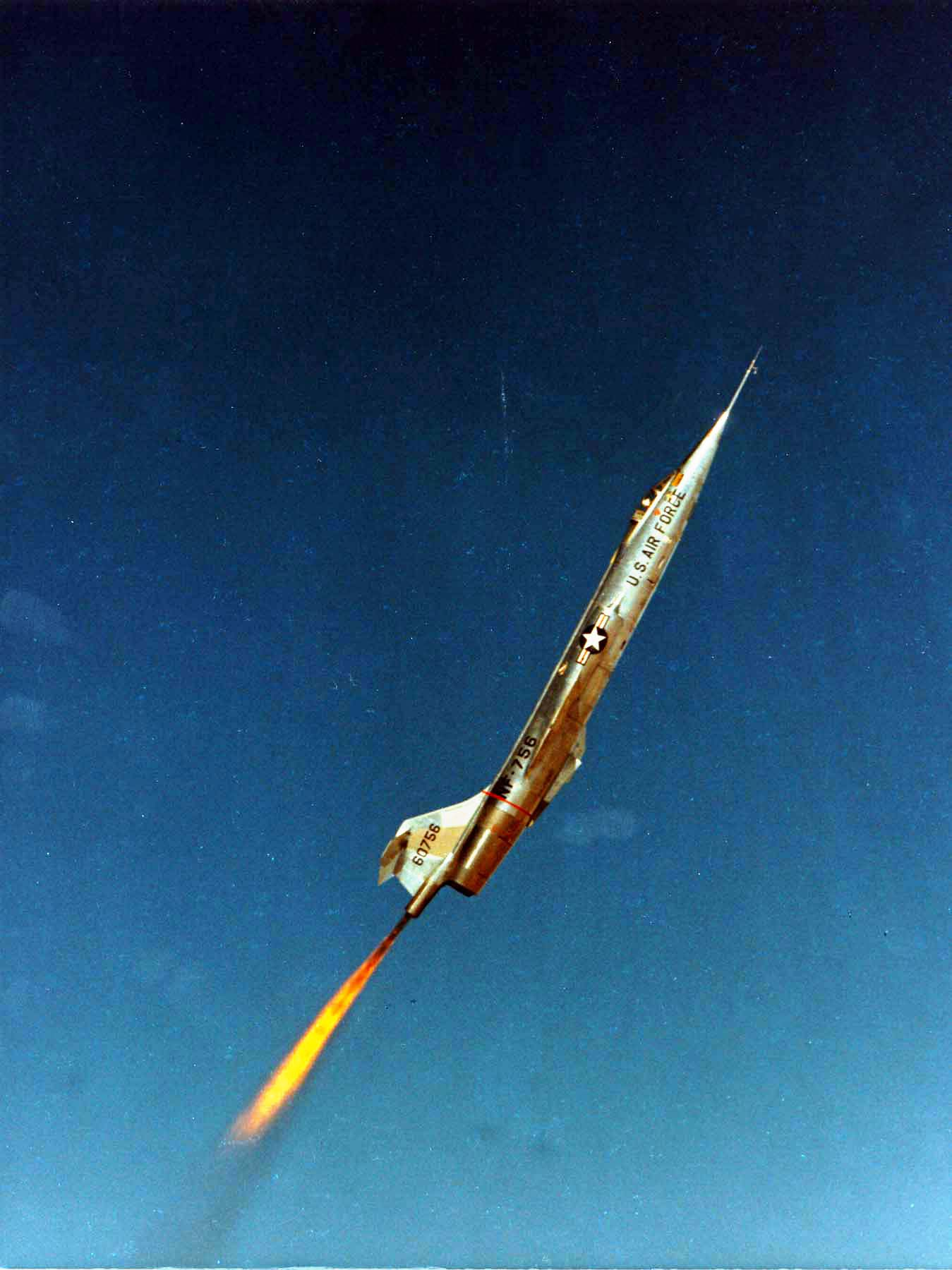
Lockheed NF-104A, 56-0756, zoom climbing with rocket power

A zoom climb or an unrestricted climb is a maneuver in which the rate of climb is greater than the maximum climb rate using only the thrust of the aircraft's engines. The additional climb rate is attained by reduction of horizontal speed. Before a zoom climb, the aircraft accelerates to a high airspeed at an altitude at which it can operate in sustained level flight. The pilot then pulls steeply upward, trading the kinetic energy of forward motion for altitude (potential energy). This is different from a steady climb, where the increase in potential energy comes from mechanical work done by the engines.

Zoom climbs are somewhat commonly performed by modern fighter aircraft and are typically referred to as "unrestricted climbs" in this context. Pilots will take off, accelerate to high speed at low altitude, and then pull the aircraft vertical or nearly vertical to quickly climb to the aircraft's cruising altitude.

== Performance history ==
Zoom climbs have been used to test new aircraft designs and conduct research in different flight regimes.

An NF-104A fitted with an additional rocket engine was regularly used in zoom-climb research for future spaceflight. On 7 May 1958, the aircraft reached an altitude of 27,812 m (91,247 ft) in a zoom climb at Edwards Air Force Base, setting a new altitude record. The Mach 2 mission took the airplane so high that the standard F-104's engine routinely exceeded its temperature limit and had to be shut down. Sometimes the engine simply flamed out for lack of air. Then the pilot steered the aircraft like a returning spaceship to a lower altitude, where he would restart the engine. An NF-104 set an unofficial altitude record of 36,800 m (120,800 ft) on 6 December 1963.

NASA tested a reaction control system on the JF-104, derived from a YF-104A, to give the jet maneuverability over 24,000 m (80,000 ft) in the thin air where normal control surfaces have little effect.

On 4 September 1959, a specially modified Sukhoi Su-9 (designated T-431) set a record of 28,852 m (94,659 ft) using a zoom climb.

On 6 December 1959, during the proving phase of the McDonnell Douglas F-4 Phantom II, an early version of the aircraft (the XF4H-1) performed a zoom climb to 30,040 m (98,557 ft) as part of Operation "Top Flight". Commander Lawrence E. Flint Jr. accelerated his aircraft to 14,330 m (47,010 ft) at Mach 2.5 and climbed to 27,430 m (89,990 ft) at a 45-degree angle. He then shut down the engines and glided to the peak altitude. As the aircraft fell through 21,300 m (69,900 ft), Flint restarted the engines and resumed normal flight.

On 10 December 1963, flight test pilot Chuck Yeager was nearly killed flying a heavily modified F-104.

On 25 July 1973, Aleksandr Fedotov reached 35,230 m (115,580 ft) in a Mikoyan-Gurevich MiG-25M with a 1,000 kg (2,200 lb) payload, and 36,240 m (118,900 ft) with no load (an absolute world record). In the thin air, the engines flamed out and the aircraft coasted in a ballistic trajectory by inertia alone. At the apex, the indicated airspeed (IAS) had dropped to 75 km/h (47 mph). On 31 August 1977, Fedotov broke his own record by reaching 123,520 ft (37,650 m), which remains the record for highest crewed jet aircraft and highest self-launched planes as of 2023.

Without engine power, the cockpit would depressurize on these missions. Above 43,000 ft (13,106 m), the standard oxygen system cannot provide blood oxygen saturation enough for the pilot to function, so a full-body pressure suit must be used.

In a 1984 demonstration of their performance, an English Electric Lightning fighter aircraft used a zoom climb to intercept a Lockheed U-2 cruising at 66,000 ft (20,000 m), above the Lightning's service ceiling of 60,000 ft (18,000 m). Shortly before this, it had even reached 88,000 ft (27,000 m).

== See also ==
- Flight altitude record
- Climb (aeronautics)
- Aerobatic maneuver
