= Darryl Greenamyer =

American aviator (1936–2018)

Darryl George Greenamyer
- Born: August 13, 1936; South Gate, California, U.S.
- Died: October 1, 2018 (aged 82); Indio, California, U.S.
- Spouse: Gisela Greenamyer
- Relatives: Jaime Engstrom, Kheli Sears, Sheyna Ochs

Darryl Greenamyer Reno Air Races 2002 by Don Ramey Logan

Darryl George Greenamyer (August 13, 1936 – October 1, 2018) was an American aviator. He started his flying career in the US Air Force Reserve. After leaving the Air Force, he then began to work at Lockheed where he eventually became an SR-71 test pilot at Skunk works. While working at Lockheed he met many of the engineers who would later help him make modifications to future race planes. He won his first victory in the Unlimited Class at the Reno Air Races in 1965. He is the third most successful competitor in Reno Air Race history.

== History ==
On August 16, 1969, flying the highly modified Grumman F8F-2 Bearcat "Conquest I" (N1111L), Greenamyer broke the 30-year-old FAI Class C-1 Group I 3 km speed record with a speed of 777.38 kilometres per hour (483.04 mph). An earlier attempt in 1966 by Greenamyer had to be aborted due to directional stability problems and an attempt in 1968 ended with a blown piston. The previous record had been set by Fritz Wendel flying a German Messerschmitt Me 209 in 1939. The record-breaking was featured in the 1970 documentary "Man for the Record" (Pennzoil/Cobra Enterprises). Greenamyer won the National Air Races six times with this airplane before donating it to the Smithsonian in 1977.

=== "Red Baron" F-104 ===
On October 24, 1977, Greenamyer, flying a modified F-104 Starfighter "Red Baron" (N104RB), set a FAI Class C-1 Group III 3 km speed record of 1,590.45 kilometres per hour (988.26 mph), which still stands. An earlier attempt on October 2, 1976, yielded a higher speed (1,630 km/h), but one timing camera didn't work on one run, meaning the record couldn't be certified.

Greenamyer built the Starfighter by collecting and putting together myriad parts over a 13-year period. The cockpit side panels and some control column bearings of the Red Baron came from the very first production F-104A, which crashed in Palmdale, California 22 years earlier. The tail of the Red Baron, minus stabilizers, came from a junkyard in Ontario, California. The stabilizers and some nose wheel parts were from scrap piles in Tucson and Homestead, Florida. The idler arm for the elevator controls, the ejection seat rails and some electrical relays came from an F-104 that crashed and burned at Edwards Air Force Base on the edge of the Mojave Desert. Greenamyer got his throttle quadrant from a Tennessee flying buff he met at the Reno National Air Races. The trunnion mounts for the nose gear, some of the cooling-system valves and a few relays on the Red Baron came from a 25-ton pile of junk that Greenamyer bought at Eglin Air Force Base. In a swap with NASA, he obtained the nose of a Lockheed NF-104A, with its reaction controls. The all-important J79-GE-10 engine was obtained from the US Navy.

On February 26, 1978, while preparing an assault on the FAI altitude record using the same aircraft, Greenamyer was unable to get the landing gear to lock before landing. As it was dangerous to land in this condition, he was forced to eject and the airplane was destroyed.

=== Other projects ===
In 1994, Greenamyer led an unsuccessful mission to rescue the Kee Bird, a B-29 aircraft which crash-landed in Greenland in 1947. The attempted recovery resulted in the loss of the airframe by fire on the ground on 21 May 1995.

Greenamyer had been working on building an Unlimited Class racer named "Shockwave". This racer combines the outer wing panels of a Sea Fury with a new centre section and fuselage. The tail is from a F-86 Sabre and it is planned to be powered by a Pratt & Whitney R-4360.

After the Sport Class was introduced at the Reno Air Races in 1998, Greenamyer built a Lancair Legacy (N33XP) that he has since raced successfully.

== Other sports ==
Besides aircraft, Greenamyer was also active in drag racing. In addition, he owned several classic Ferraris.

== Awards ==
Greenamyer was inducted into the Motorsports Hall of Fame of America in 1997.

Greenamyer received the Iven C. Kincheloe Award in 1970 for the successful speed record achievement in 1969.

== See also ==
- List of F-104 Starfighter operators
- Fastest propeller-driven aircraft
