= Lockheed NF-104A =

Astronaut training aircraft conversion

NF-104A
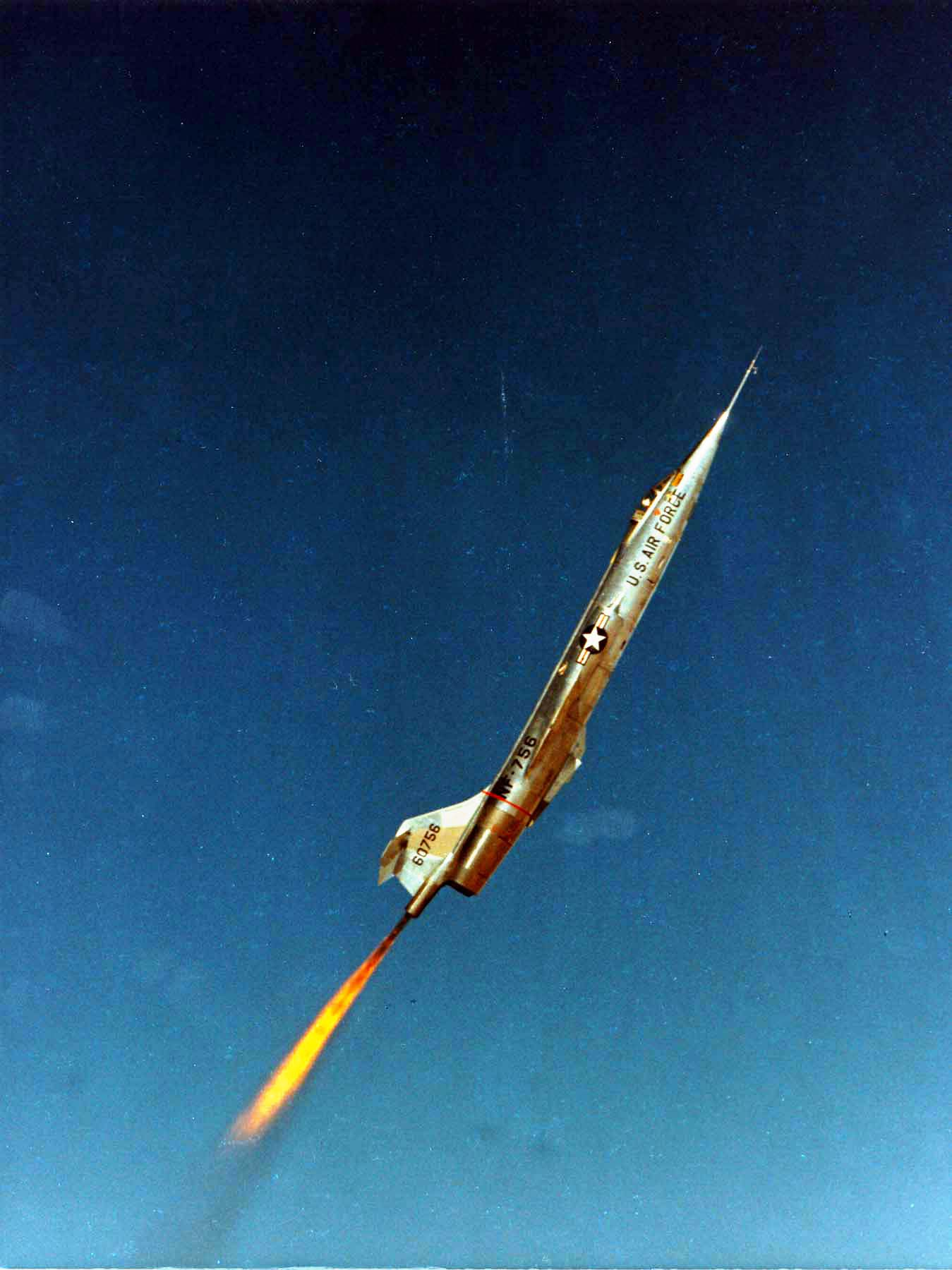
- Lockheed NF-104A, 56-0756, climbing with rocket power

General information
- Type: Aerospace trainer
- Manufacturer: Lockheed Aircraft Corporation
- Designer: Clarence "Kelly" Johnson
- Primary user: United States Air Force
- Number built: 3

History
- Introduction date: 1 October 1963
- First flight: 9 July 1963
- Retired: June 1971
- Developed from: Lockheed F-104 Starfighter

The Lockheed NF-104A is an American mixed-power, high-performance, supersonic aerospace trainer that served as a low-cost astronaut training vehicle for the North American X-15 and projected Boeing X-20 Dyna-Soar programs.

Three aircraft were modified from existing Lockheed F-104A Starfighter airframes, and served with the Aerospace Research Pilots School between 1963 and 1971. The modifications included a small supplementary rocket engine and a reaction control system for flight in the stratosphere. During the test program, the maximum altitude reached was more than 120,000 ft (36,600 m). One of the aircraft was destroyed in an accident while being flown by Chuck Yeager. The accident was depicted in the book The Right Stuff and the 1983 film. On December 10, 2019, Edwards Air Force Base released the complete video transcription of films of the 1963 flight and subsequent crash.

== Development ==
With the advent of human spaceflight in the early 1960s, the United States Air Force (USAF) Experimental Flight Test Pilot's School at Edwards Air Force Base was renamed the Aerospace Research Pilots School (ARPS), with the emphasis on training moving away from the traditional test pilot course to a more spaceflight-oriented curriculum.

=== Initial use of unmodified F-104 aircraft ===
A number of standard production F-104 Starfighters were obtained (including F-104D two-seat versions) and used by the ARPS to simulate the low lift/high drag glide approach path profiles of the X-15 and the projected X-20 Dyna-Soar program. These maneuvers were commenced at 12,000 ft (3,700 m) where the F-104 engine was throttled back to 80% power; and with the flaps, speedbrakes and landing gear extended, the aircraft was established in a 30° dive with a pull-out for the landing flare starting at 1,500 feet (500 m) above the ground. These glide approaches gave little room for error.

=== Reaction control system ===
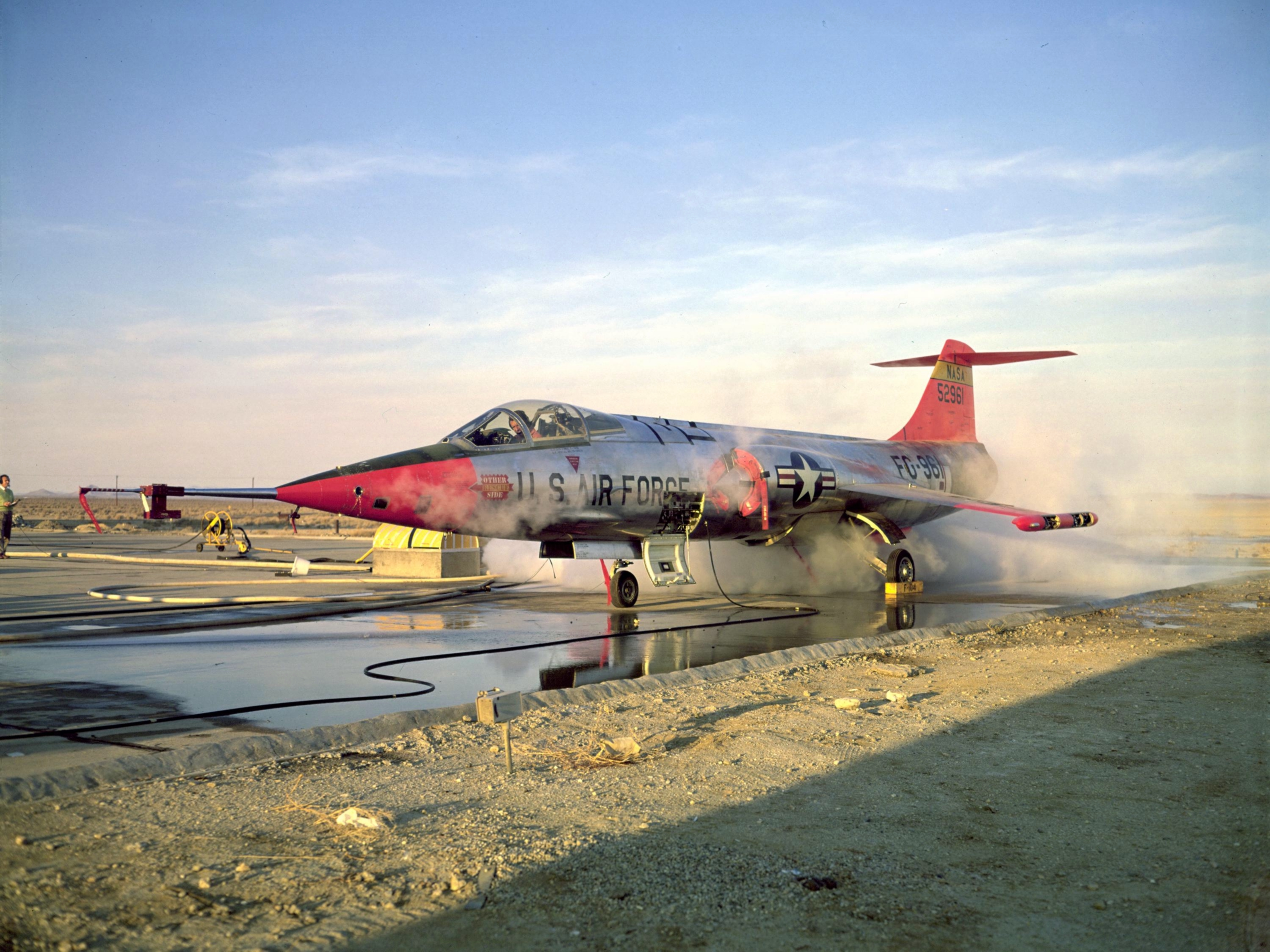
JF-104 during RCS testing.

It was realized that normal aircraft control surfaces had little or no effect in the thin air of the upper stratosphere and that any aircraft operating at extremely high altitudes would need to be equipped with a reaction control system (RCS). A modified version of the Bell X-1 was used for initial RCS tests, but was grounded after technical problems. It was replaced in 1959 with a NASA-modified Lockheed F-104A (55-2961), which carried RCS systems on its wing tips and in the fuselage nose. This aircraft (designated JF-104) achieved a maximum altitude of 83,000 feet (25,300 m) during the test program. Pilots who flew this aircraft included Neil Armstrong, who gained valuable experience in using the RCS. Pilots complained that the instrument displays were difficult to read and were not accurate enough for the critical zoom climb profiles required to reach high altitudes.

=== Lockheed contract ===
Lockheed was awarded a contract by the United States Air Force to modify three F-104A aircraft for the dedicated role of aerospace trainer (AST) in 1962. The airframes were taken out of storage at AMARG and transported to the company factory for modification.

== Design and flight profile ==
The F-104A design was already established as a lightweight, high-performance aircraft. For the AST project, emphasis was placed on removing unnecessary equipment, fitting a rocket engine to supplement the existing jet engine, fitting an onboard RCS, and improving the instrumentation. The following are the main differences between the production version and the AST:

=== Wing ===
The wingspan of the NF-104A was increased by the addition of wingtip extensions. This modification was needed to house the RCS roll control thrusters and decreased the wing loading.

=== Tail surfaces ===
The vertical fin and rudder were replaced by the larger area versions from the two-seat F-104 and were structurally modified to allow installation of the rocket engine.

=== Fuselage ===
The fiberglass nose radome was replaced with an aluminum skin and housed the pitch and yaw RCS thrusters.

The air intakes originally designed by Ben Rich were of the same fixed geometry as the F-104A, but included extensions to the inlet cones for optimal jet engine operation at higher Mach numbers. Internal fuselage differences included provision for rocket propellant oxidizer tanks and removal of the M61 Vulcan cannon, radar equipment and unnecessary avionics. A nitrogen tank was installed for cabin pressurization purposes. This was required, as there would be no bleed air available from the engine after its normal and expected cutoff in the climb phase.

=== Rocket engine ===
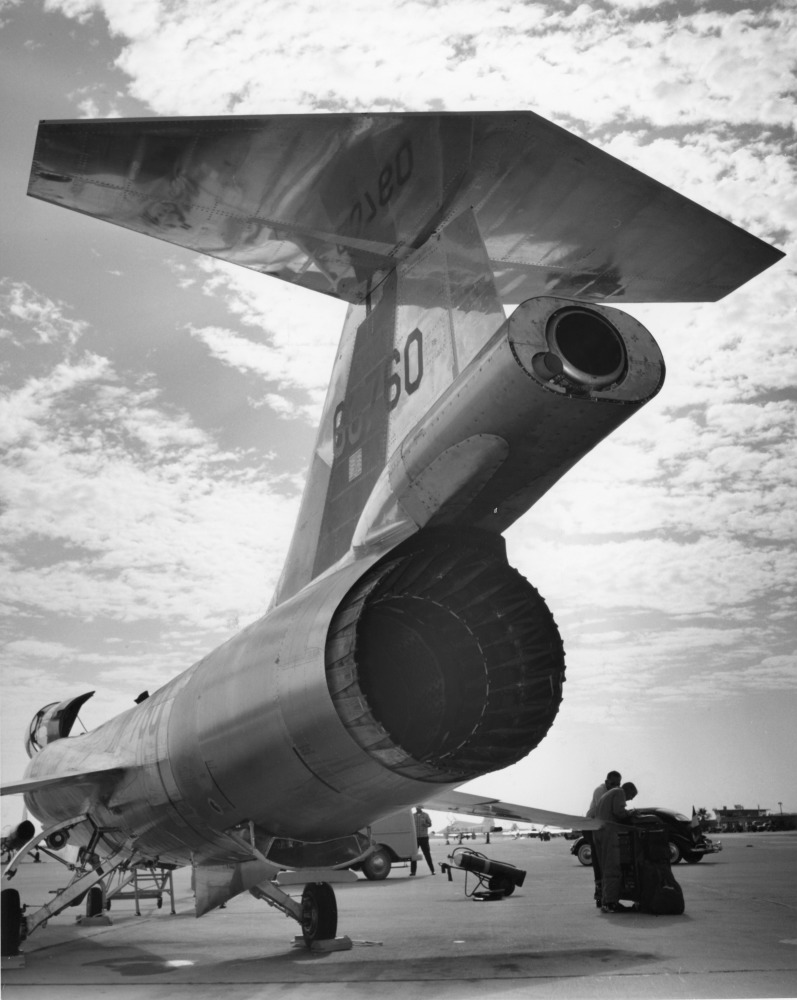
The rocket engine - Lockheed NF-104A 56-0760

In addition to the standard General Electric J79 jet engine, a Rocketdyne AR2-3 rocket engine was fitted at the base of the vertical fin. This engine burned a mixture of JP-4 jet fuel and 90% hydrogen peroxide oxidizer solution. The NF-104 carried enough oxidizer for approximately 100 seconds of rocket engine operation. The thrust level could be adjusted to maximum or approximately half power by the pilot using an additional throttle lever on the left side of the cockpit.

=== Reaction control system ===
The reaction control system consisted of eight pitch/yaw thrusters (four for each axis) and four roll thrusters. They used the same kind of hydrogen peroxide fuel as the main rocket engine from a dedicated 155 lb (70 kg) fuel tank and were controlled by the pilot using a handle mounted in the instrument panel. The pitch/yaw thrusters were rated at 113 lbf (500 N) thrust each and the roll thrusters were rated at 43 lbf (190 N) thrust.

=== Typical flight profile ===
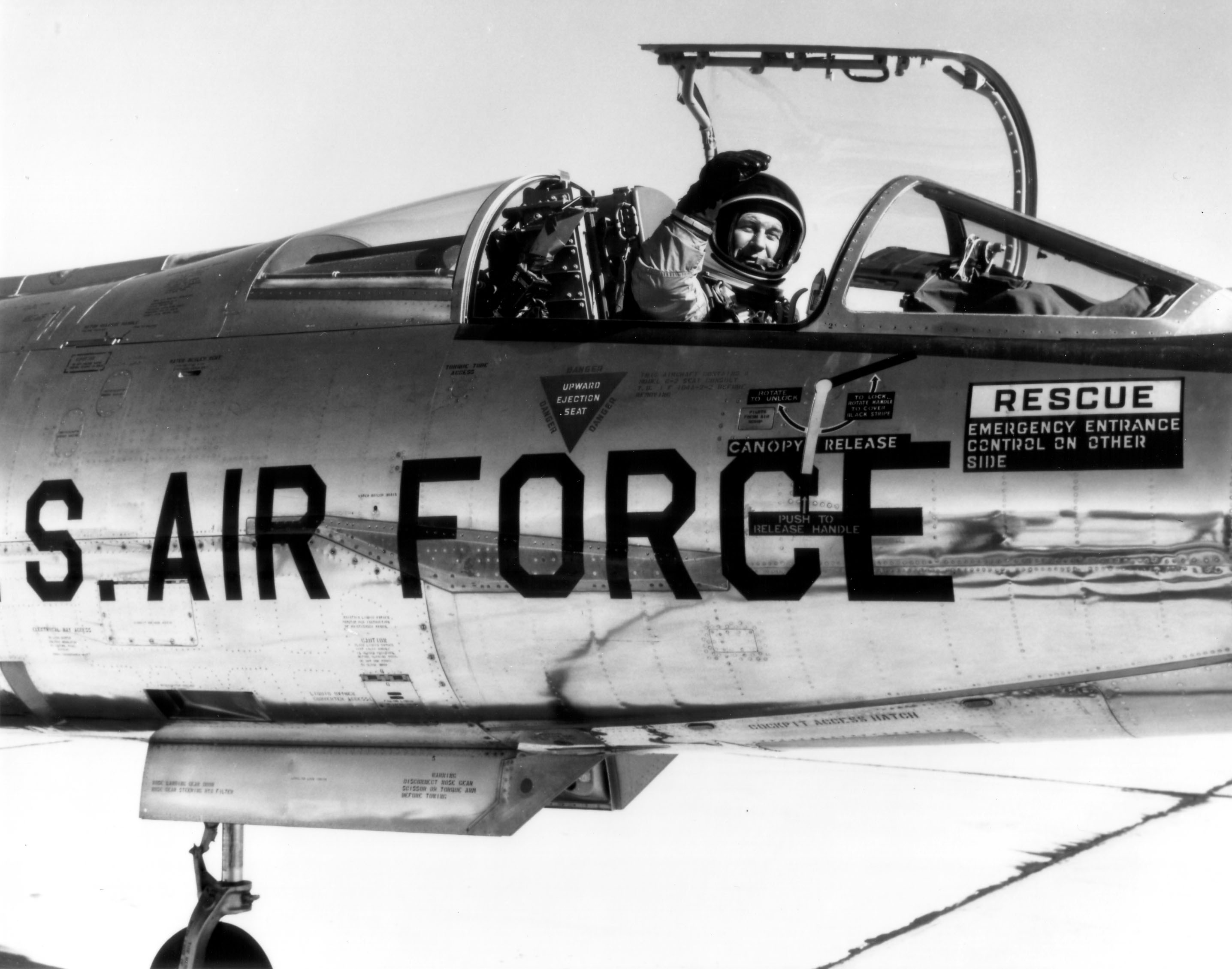
Chuck Yeager in the cockpit of an NF-104A, 4 December 1963

The NF-104A was able to reach great altitudes through a combination of zoom climbing (building up a high speed in a shallow dive at high altitude, and then climbing steeply, converting speed and momentum into altitude) and use of the rocket engine (to reach higher level speeds and to maintain climb rate for as long as possible after entering the zoom climb). A typical mission involved a level acceleration at 35,000 feet (10,700 m) to Mach 1.9 where the rocket engine would be ignited, and on reaching Mach 2.1 the aircraft would be pitched up to a climb angle of 50-70° by carefully applying a load equal to 3.5 g. The J79 afterburner would start to be throttled down at approximately 70,000 feet (21,300 m) followed shortly after by manual fuel cutoff of the main jet engine itself around 85,000 feet (25,900 m) to prevent fast-rising engine temperatures from damaging the turbine stages of the jet engine due to decreased air density, which reduced airflow through the engine for cooling. After continuing over the top of its ballistic arc, the NF-104 would descend back into denser air where the main engine could be restarted using the windmill restart technique for recovery to a landing.

== Operational history ==
=== First NF-104A ===
The first NF-104A (USAF 56-0756) was accepted by the USAF on 1 October 1963. It quickly established a new unofficial altitude record of 118,860 feet (36,230 m) and surpassed this on 6 December 1963 by achieving an altitude of 120,800 feet (36,800 m). The aircraft was damaged in flight June 1963 when a rocket oxidizer vessel exploded. It suffered an inflight rocket motor explosion in June 1971. Although the pilot was able to land safely, the damaged aircraft was retired and this marked the end of the NF-104 project. This aircraft was transferred to the National Museum of the United States Air Force. It is on display at Nevada County Air Park, Grass Valley, California. wearing the markings of "56-0751".

=== Second NF-104A ===
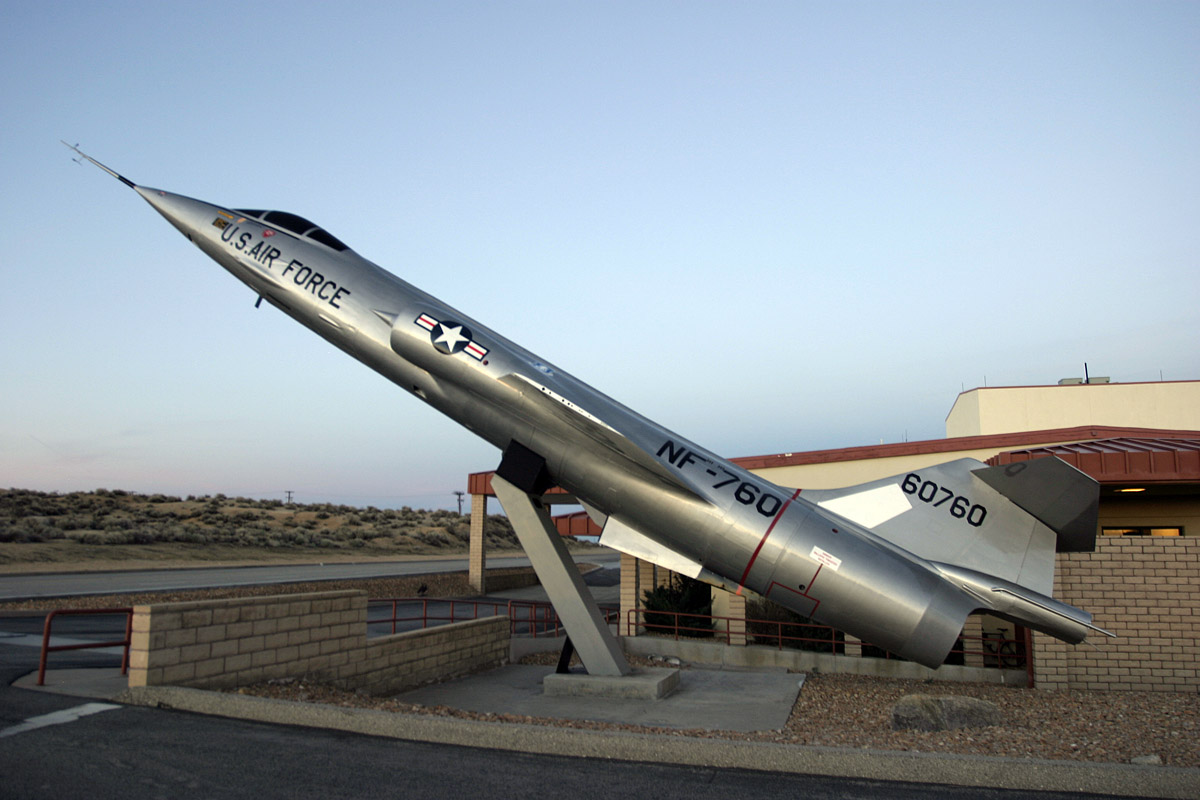
NF-104A Tail Number 760 at the U.S. Air Force Test Pilot School.

The second NF-104A (USAF 56-0760) was accepted by the USAF on 26 October 1963. After retirement, this aircraft was mounted on a pole outside the U.S. Air Force Test Pilot School at Edwards Air Force Base and can still be seen there today. The extended wingtips, RCS, metal nose cone, and other parts from 56-0760 were loaned to Darryl Greenamyer for his civilian aviation record attempts using a highly modified F-104. When he was forced to eject during a record flight, his aircraft was destroyed and the parts were never returned.

=== Third NF-104A ===
The third NF-104A (USAF 56-0762) was delivered to the USAF on 1 November 1963, and was destroyed in a crash while being piloted by Chuck Yeager on 10 December 1963. This accident was depicted in the book Yeager: An Autobiography, and the book and film adaptation of The Right Stuff. The aircraft used for filming was a standard F-104G flying with its wingtip fuel tanks removed, but otherwise lacked any of the NF-104A's modifications, most visibly the angled-up rocket engine at the base of the vertical stabilizer.

== Operators ==
United States

- United States Air Force

== Specifications (NF-104A) ==
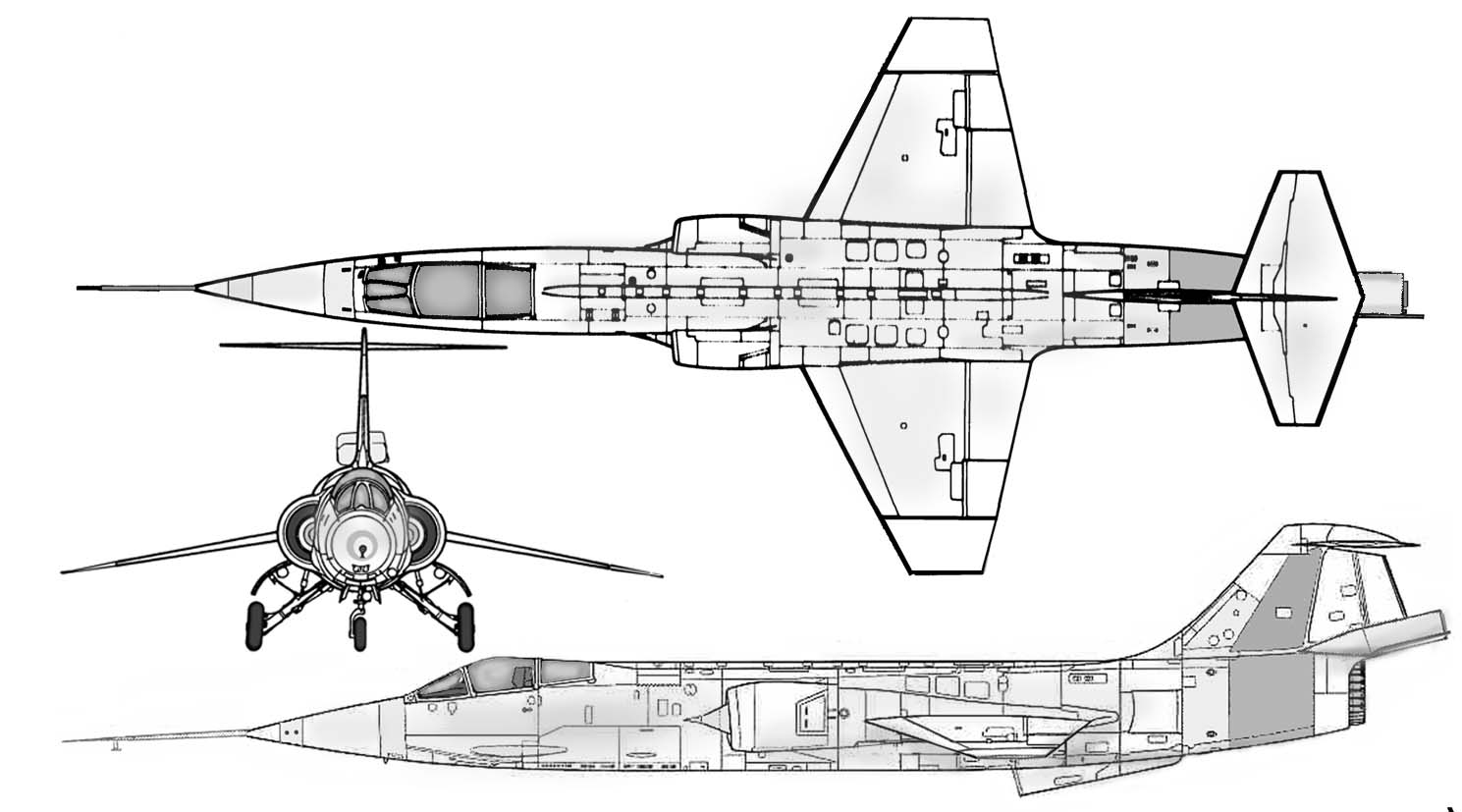

Data from Libis.

General characteristics

- Crew: 1
- Length: 54 ft 9 in (16.69 m)
- Wingspan: 25 ft 9 in (7.85 m)
- Height: 13 ft 6 in (4.11 m)
- Wing area: 212.8 sq ft (19.77 m^{2})
- Airfoil: Biconvex 3.36%
- Empty weight: 13,500 lb (6,123 kg)
- Gross weight: 21,400 lb (9,707 kg)
- Powerplant: 1 × General Electric J79-GE-3B afterburning turbojet engine, 9,600 lbf (43 kN) thrust dry, 14,800 lbf (66 kN) with afterburner
- Powerplant: 1 × Rocketdyne AR2-3 liquid-fuelled rocket engine, 6,000 lbf (27 kN) thrust

Performance

- Maximum speed: Mach 2.2

== See also ==
- Century Series
- Robert Henry Lawrence Jr.

Related development

- Aeritalia F-104S
- Canadair CF-104
- CL-1200 Lancer and Lockheed X-27
- Lockheed F-104 Starfighter
- Lockheed XF-104 Starfighter

Aircraft of comparable role, configuration, and era

- Saunders-Roe SR.53
- Saunders-Roe SR.177

Related lists

- List of fighter aircraft
- List of Lockheed F-104 Starfighter operators
- List of military aircraft of the United States
- List of rocket aircraft
