= N104RB Red Baron =

Record-setting fighter aircraft

Red Baron

General information
- Type: Lockheed F-104 Starfighter
- Construction number: (c/n 2051-hybrid)
- Registration: N104RB

History
- Fate: Destroyed during flight accident

The Red Baron was a highly modified Lockheed F-104 Starfighter which set a FAI Class C-1 Group III 3 km speed record of 1,590.45 kilometres per hour (988.26 mph), in 1977 which still stands. It was assembled by Darryl Greenamyer and sponsored by Ed Browning and the Red Baron Flying Service of Idaho Falls, Idaho. The aircraft was destroyed in an accident in 1978.

== History ==
Greenamyer built the Starfighter by collecting and putting together myriad parts over a 13-year period. The cockpit side panels and some control column bearings of the Red Baron came from the very first production F-104A, which crashed in Palmdale, California 22 years earlier. The tail of the Red Baron, minus stabilizers, came from a junkyard in Ontario, California. The stabilizers and some nose wheel parts were from scrap piles in Tucson and Homestead, Florida. The idler arm for the elevator controls, the ejection seat rails and some electrical relays came from an F-104 that crashed and burned at Edwards Air Force Base on the edge of the Mojave Desert. Greenamyer got his throttle quadrant from a Tennessee flying buff he met at the Reno Air Races. The trunnion mounts for the nose gear, some of the cooling-system valves and a few relays on the Red Baron came from a 25-ton pile of junk that Greenamyer bought at Eglin Air Force Base. In a swap with NASA, he obtained the nose of a Lockheed NF-104A, with its reaction controls. The all-important J79-GE-10 engine was obtained from the US Navy.

Greenamyer's ultimate goal was to reclaim the altitude record, which had been set by a Soviet MiG-25 Foxbat. His attempt at the speed record was for the purpose of raising enough funding to enable the altitude attempt. To combat the effects of high altitude, Greenamyer developed a system to water-cool the air at the engine intakes—effectively increasing the air density. He also installed the nose of a Lockheed NF-104A with eight hydrogen peroxide thrusters around the nose to provide added directional stability as the control surfaces lost effect.

== Flight records and fate ==
On 2 October 1976 Greenamyer flew an average 1,630 kilometres per hour (1,010 mph) at Mud Lake near Tonopah, Nevada. A tracking camera malfunction eliminated the necessary proof for formal records. On 24 October 1977 Greenamyer flew a 3 km official FAI record flight of 1,590.45 kilometres per hour (988.26 mph).

On 26 February 1978 Greenamyer made a practice run for the altitude record attempt. After the attempt, he was unable to get a lock light on the left wheel; after multiple touch-and-go tests at an Edwards Air Force Base runway, he determined that it was not safe to land. He ejected, and N104RB crashed in the desert.

== Specifications ==
Data from

General characteristics

- Crew: 1
- Length: 54 ft 6 in (16.6 m)
- Wingspan: 25 ft 9 in (7.84 m)
- Height: 13 ft 5 in (4.1 m)
- Wing area: 212.8 sq ft (19.77 m^{2})
- Airfoil: Bi-convex 3.36%
- Empty weight: 11,500 lb (5,216 kg)
- Powerplant: 1 × General Electric J79-GE-10 afterburning turbojet, 17,900 lbf (80 kN) with afterburner

Performance

- Maximum speed: Mach 2.6
