= Chidi Nwaogu =

Nigerian entrepreneur

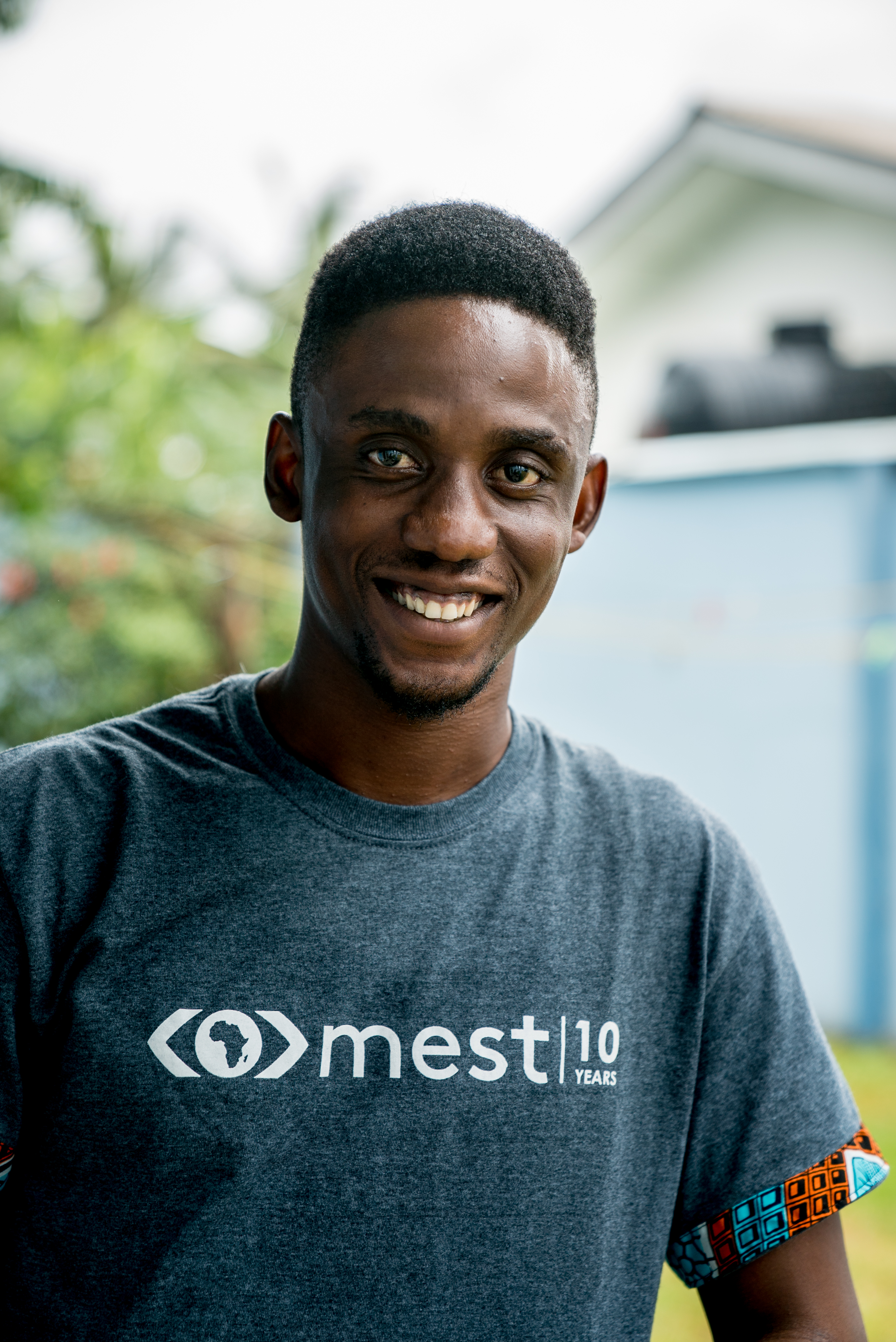
- Chidi Nwaogu at MEST Africa

Personal details
- Born: Dominic Chidiebere Nwaogu; 20 May 1990 (age 36) Lagos State, Nigeria
- Education: University of Lagos; Meltwater Entrepreneurial School of Technology
- Occupation: Tech Entrepreneur and Software Engineer
- Known for: Co-Founder and CEO of Publiseer; Co-Founder and CTO at Efiwe
- Awards: Africa's Business Heroes Prize by Jack Ma Foundation; Africa Prize For Engineering Innovation by Royal Academy of Engineering
- Website: nwaogu.com

Dominic Chidiebere Nwaogu (born 20 May 1990) is a Nigerian tech entrepreneur and software developer, who is presently one of the founders of Efiwe, a mobile-first, AI-powered coding platform, and Publiseer, a Lagos-based digital publishing company. Before the creation of Publiseer, he founded and sold two startup companies, which includes LAGbook, a social network with more than one million registered users, which was acquired in 2013.

In 2021, Chidi was recognized by the Jack Ma Foundation as one of the Top 10 Africa's Business Heroes, and in the same year, was listed on the YNaija Power List as one of the 100 Most Powerful Young Nigerians. In 2026, he was recognized by YNaija as one of the 100 Most Impactful People in Tech, and in the same year, was one of the 2 Nigerians featured on the Africa Prize for Engineering Innovation list by the Royal Academy of Engineering.

== Early life ==
Chidi grew up in a family of entrepreneurs with no university education. At the age of 7, his mother lost her job because she wasn't a computer literate. This made her buy a computer so Chidi and his twin brother, Chika, wouldn't experience the same problem. Chidi and Chika taught themselves to code, and had developed a video game at the age of 16.

Chidi went on to study Physics at the University of Lagos, before proceeding to Meltwater Entrepreneurial School of Technology (MEST Africa) in Ghana to study Software Entrepreneurship. He briefly attended Imo State University, where he studied Electrical and Electronics Engineering.

== Career ==
=== LAGbook ===
LAGbook was a social networking service from Nigeria, which targeted young individuals between the ages of 18 and 30, looking to make friends online. With 4,000 daily new registrations, the social network also had users from India, Germany, Canada, and Spain. Founded in 2010 by Chidi and his brother, Chika, while they were still studying at the University of Lagos, LAGbook reached one million registered users within three years.

=== Publiseer ===
Founded in 2017 with his twin brother, Publiseer works with independent African creators to monetize their creative content in 100 countries. The company was identified by the International Finance Corporation as one of the startups "that could speed up innovation in Africa". As of September 2022, Publiseer has worked with 8,000 creators in Africa, including Nigerian recording artists, Erigga and CDQ. In partnership with Google, Publiseer is available in Nigeria, Kenya, Ghana, South Africa, and Egypt. Based on the number of creators on its platform, Publiseer has been referred to as, "one of the largest independent digital publishers in Africa". In 2019, Publiseer launched “publiSHEr” to serve its female authors and artists.

=== Savvy ===
Chidi is one of the founders of Savvy, a program that trains, supports, and funds entrepreneurs. In partnership with the Kenya Private Sector Alliance, Savvy has trained 7,500 entrepreneurs. Savvy was founded in 2020, and the virtually conducted program is available in about 100 languages and is funded by the International Telecommunication Union and the United Nations Office for South-South Cooperation.

== Awards and recognition ==
In 2020, Chidi received the Migration Entrepreneurship Prize by the Swiss Federal Department of Foreign Affairs. Other awards include the African Entrepreneurship Award by Bank of Africa, Roddenberry Foundation Catalyst Award, the International Telecommunication Union Award for Global Innovation, and the HundrED Global Collection Award for Leading Education Innovation.

In 2025, Chidi was recognized by Legit.ng as one of the "Young Nigerian Investors That Will Shape 2025", and in 2022, as one of the "8 most outstanding business personalities in Nigeria". In 2024, The New Africa Magazine listed Chidi as one of the "100 Young and Exceptional Africans". Also, in 2019, he was recognised by Tekedia as one of the "most sought-after young Nigerian entrepreneurs" and in the same year, won the first prize in the 'Entrepreneurship' category at the Africa 35.35 Awards.

In 2025, Chidi was recognized by Vanguard as one of the "innovators shaping Africa’s digital future", and in 2026, he was shortlisted by the Royal Academy of Engineering as one of the "16 innovators for the 2026 Africa Prize For Engineering Innovation".

Other recognitions include YNaija's New Establishment, Empire Magazine Africa's Top 5 African Tech Founders Under 40, and Impact 100 Nigeria. Chidi has been selected for fellowship programs like Acumen Fellowship, University of Virginia's Contemplative Sciences Center's Dalai Lama Fellowship, Mastercard Foundation Edtech Fellowship, French-African Foundation Young Leaders, and Westerwelle Foundation Young Leaders.

== Publications ==
- "Dear Entrepreneur". 2021. ISBN 979-8-7396-4833-4
