= Enonchong =

Enonchong is a surname. Notable people with the surname include:

- Henry Ndifor Abi Enonchong (1934–2008), Cameroonian barrister
- Rebecca Enonchong (born 1967), Cameroonian technology entrepreneur, daughter of Henry
