= Public Relations Consultants Association Ltd v Newspaper Licensing Agency Ltd =

Public Relations Consultants Association v The Newspaper Licensing Agency Ltd ([2013] UKSC 18, on appeal from: [2011] EWCA Civ 890 ) was a 2011 case UK Supreme Court case decided in 2013.

It essentially paralleled the US case Associated Press v. Meltwater, insofar as it considered the same questions and essentially the same nature of plaintiffs, and the same defendant, as the US case - namely whether media clippings business Meltwater Group was in breach of copyright by providing a paid clippings services from (copyrighted) news sources, to its clients.

The UK case, was decided by lower courts in favour of the NLA at the initial case and at appeal. The Court of Appeal ruled that 'most if not all' reports would be subject to copyright, and confirmed that headlines in bulk were also subject. One element was overturned by the UK Supreme Court who ruled users were entitled to view, but not print or copy, a hypothetical reduced Meltwater report without a licence. The practical effect at the end was that Meltwater and their clients took a licence. Certain questions referred to the European Court of Justice were intended to clarify matters of a cross-border nature.

== Issue ==
Meltwater Group operated a media monitoring service in which relevant results are shown to clients who pay Meltwater, but do not buy a license from a newspaper company or copyright service to read the brief extracts displayed to them by Meltwater (unless they wish to proceed and view the entire source article). NLA media access, part of the Newspaper Licensing Agency (NLA), a licensing organization, introduced a license covering media monitoring services that crawl sites and offer paid-for services based on their filtered results. The majority of media monitoring agencies signed up for the new NLA web licence with the exception of Meltwater who argued no license was required by its clients for this purpose, and in conjunction with the PRCA referred the scheme to the Copyright Tribunal, and the matter was escalated. The case revolved around whether a client lacking a license would infringe copyright by being shown, and viewing, the extracts from copyrighted material in this way. (It was common ground that to subsequently view a full article would of course require a license.) NLA argued that for an end user to view indexed media, and viewable extracts, constituted 'copying' and re-use by the end user, and was therefore infringing.

== Ruling ==
It was held that Meltwater's clients did not need a license to view copyright material on a computer as collated by Meltwater, on the rationale that:

1. "Article 5.1 [of the European Directive Directive 2001/29/EC which covers "temporary copies"] is an exception to the copyright owner’s right to control the reproduction of his work. It necessarily operates to authorize certain copying which would otherwise be an infringement of the copyright owner’s rights."
2. "[I]t has never been an infringement, in either English or EU law, for a person merely to view or read an infringing article in physical form. This state of affairs, which is recognised in the enumeration of the copyright owner’s rights in articles 2, 3 and 4 of the Directive, has never been thought inconsistent with a high level of protection for intellectual property." (Also noted was that to prohibit mere viewing would make infringers of millions of people who would be unaware or unable to prevent themselves from being shown, or temporary automated copies made, of such material, insofar as almost all online content is some person's copyright.)
3. The court noted in its ruling, that earlier rulings were made without the benefit or citation of recent crucial cases such as Football Association Premier League Ltd v QC Leisure and Others (C-403/08, F.S.R. 495), Karen Murphy v Media Protection Services Ltd ('Premier League') (C-429/08, 1 CMLR 769), and Infopaq International A/S v. Danske Dagblades Forening ('Infopaq II') (Case C-302/10), which strongly informed the outcome.

In particular, the Murphy case had ruled that the transmission of copyrighted material through a network was legal regardless of the standing or authorization of the prospective end user (whomever it might be), and therefore temporary copies used for the technical purpose of communicating a copyright information was by implication also lawful provided the eventual act was lawful and certain other conditions were likely to be met. Since the 'eventual act' was mere viewing of copyright material, a lawful action under EU and UK law, the technical creation of temporary copies to enable that act, were also ruled lawful.

More exactly, it was a separable question, whether an end user might violate copyright in their copying of the material and whether the making of temporary copies to allow that user to view the material was itself a breach of copyright. An end user viewing the material was not of itself a copyright-breaching act (as mere viewing is not a copyright breach), therefore automated temporary copies for technical reasons, used to facilitate and enable that lawful act, were also to be deemed within the scope of EU law and lawful.

== Parallel US case ==
A parallel case (S.D.N.Y. Mar. 21, 2013) filed on the same grounds in the United States, however, was decided the other way in 2013 (against Meltwater and in favor of the equivalent newspaper licensing business, in that case Associated Press) by a US district court. In that case, the Associated Press (AP) brought suit against Meltwater Group for clipping and sharing news items under copyright infringement and "hot news" misappropriation under New York common law. In a cross-motion for summary judgement, Meltwater argued they were not infringing under the requirements of fair use. Meltwater claimed that their service was transformative and therefore non-infringing on copyright. The court held that Meltwater's copying was not protected under the United States' "fair use" doctrine and was infringing on AP's copyright. Subsequently, both the Associated Press and Meltwater dismissed all claims and counterclaims in July 2013. After the litigation, the Associated Press and Meltwater partnered to develop new products whose aim would be to benefit both companies.

== See also ==
- Associated Press v. Meltwater
