= Asoriba =

Ghanaian technology company

- Company type: Private
- Industry: Information and communications technology
- Founded: 2015
- Founder: Patrick Ohemeng Tutu, Jesse Johnson, Nana Agyemang-Prempeh, Saviour Dzage
- Headquarters: Accra, Ghana
- Products: Software, mobile app
- Website: asoriba.com

Asoriba is a technology company that provides a web application for church management and mobile application that connects church and worshipers with giving/donation functionality. The headquarters of the company is in Accra, Ghana. It has presence in Nigeria, Kenya and South Africa.

== History ==
Graduates of the Meltwater Entrepreneurial School of Technology in Accra in 2014, Patrick Ohemeng Tutu, Jesse Johnson, Nana Agyemang-Prempeh, and Savior Dzage had the idea of an application to connect churches and worshipers. In 2015, they founded Asoriba. The name of the company means "child of the Church" in Twi. In April 2016, it is one of the top 10 companies selected from 450 companies worldwide by Techstars for a 3-month startup accelerator program. In June 2016, it has 395 partner churches in Ghana, Kenya, South Africa, Nigeria and the United States, as well as 30,000 registered followers. In October 2016, Asoriba became a partner of the Nigerian Interswitch, to allow donations via mobile money transfer. In 2017, it has 1,100 partner churches in Ghana, Kenya, South Africa, Nigeria and the United States, as well as 69,000 registered followers.

== Mobile app ==
For the worshipers, the application allows access to the account of their churches, and receive text messages, audios or videos, view the agenda and make donations.

== Software ==
For churches, the software allows communication with members and financial management.

== Awards ==
- 2016: Africa's best start-up, Seedstars Summit Prizes, Switzerland
- 2017: Technology Startup of the Year, Premium Bank Ghana Startup Awards, Ghana
