= Jørn Lyseggen =

Norwegian businessman

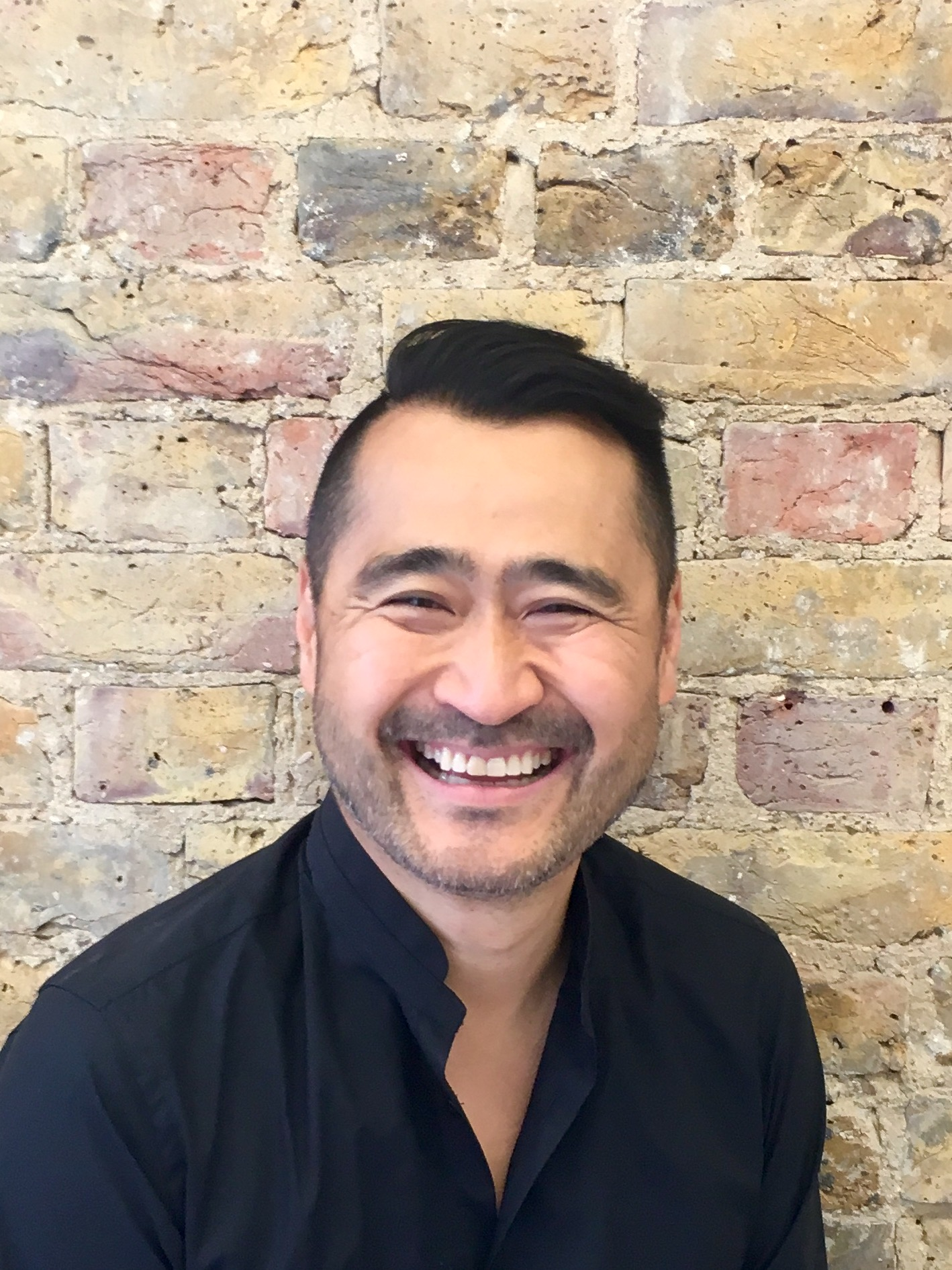
- Born: December 1, 1968 (age 57); Seoul, South Korea
- Education: Iowa State University
- Years active: 1995–present
- Title: Founder and CEO of Meltwater

Jørn Lyseggen (born December 1, 1968) is a Norwegian serial entrepreneur, patent inventor and the founder and Executive Chairman of Meltwater and the Meltwater Entrepreneurial School of Technology (MEST).

== Early life and education ==
Lyseggen was born in Korea and adopted at a young age by Norwegian parents. He earned a Bachelor of Science in electrical engineering from Bergen University College and a Master's degree in electrical engineering with a focus on artificial intelligence and signal processing from Iowa State University.

== Career ==
=== Early career ===
Lyseggen began his career as a research scientist in artificial intelligence and machine vision at the Norwegian Computing Center, but left to work in startups. His first startup was an internet consultancy founded in 1995, which reportedly counted many of the leading Norwegian media houses, including Nettavisen founded by Norwegian media entrepreneur Knut Ivar Skeid, as its clients. The company was sold in 1997 to EUnet International. In 1998, Lyseggen joined the company Mogul AS as CEO and helped to grow the company before selling it in 1999 to Optosof. He then served as CEO of Mogul Group AB and led the group to its IPO in 2000.

=== Meltwater ===
In 2001, Lyseggen established Magenta News, an online media monitoring company analyzing online news in real time in Oslo, Norway. He bootstrapped the company, starting it with just a US$15,000 investment, and within 12 years it had nearly $125 million in revenue with no venture funding. The company changed its name to Meltwater News and moved its headquarters to San Francisco in the mid 2000s.

In 2020, Lyseggen became Executive Chairman of Meltwater, with John Box becoming CEO, and oversaw Meltwater's public listing on the Euronext Growth Oslo (ticker code: MWTR).

As of 2023, Meltwater, employed over 2300 staff in over 50 cities and 25 countries while generating revenue of over $430 million. The company had also expanded its services beyond media monitoring, to social media analytics, and competitive intelligence for more than 27,000 customers worldwide.

=== Meltwater Entrepreneurial School of Technology ===
In 2008, Lyseggen created the Meltwater Foundation and launched Meltwater Entrepreneurial School of Technology (MEST) in Accra, Ghana. MEST is a Pan-African training program, seed fund and incubator for aspiring technology entrepreneurs. Through the program, the entrepreneurs in training (EIT's) are taught how to code, as well as essential business, communication and leadership skills. The final examination includes an investment pitch in front of a panel of global entrepreneurs and investors. Historically, about half the teams pitching are given seed funding from the Meltwater Foundation and incubated. MEST alumni have been enrolled in Techstars, 500 Startups, and other international accelerator programs to pursue their international expansion. MEST is funded by an annual donation of $2 million from Meltwater. In 2015, MEST was named by Fast Company as one of the top 10 most innovative organizations in Africa. In October 2021, Lyseggen was named to Digest Africa's "Most Influential People in the African Startup Ecosystem" list, ranking number 5 for his work supporting entrepreneurs and funding successful startups over the years.

=== Outside Insight ===
In 2017, Lyseggen released the book Outside Insight: Navigating a World Drowning in Data, which is aimed at helping business leaders learn how to implement data-led decisions. The book covers the role of analytics and AI in the business world as well as the importance of an outside perspective and industry trends to influence financial decisions of companies.

In an interview with Forbes, Lyseggen explains what motivated him to write the book:

"External data is one of the biggest blind spots in executive decision making today. That's because external information contains so much forward-looking information. If your competitors are hiring, and your customers are changing their behavior, those are external forces influencing your future performance, and it can be found in online ‘breadcrumbs' and external data."

=== SHACK15 ===
In 2019, Lyseggen launched SHACK15, a global community that supports the next generation of entrepreneurs, in San Francisco. SHACK15 is located in San Francisco's iconic Ferry Building with a network of partners and entrepreneurship hubs around the world.

== Awards and honors ==
- In 2016, Lyseggen received The Europa Hall of Fame Award at Europas Awards 2016. Founded in 2009, The Europas are the premier awards for Europe's tech startups and celebrate the most forward thinking, progressive and innovative tech companies across over 20 categories.
- In 2021, Lyseggen was named #5 on Digest Africa's "Top 50 Most Influential People in the African Startup Ecosystem" list for his leadership, mentorship and investment into MEST. The list featured entrepreneurs, investors, accelerators and startup executives on the African continent who have greatly affected the tech ecosystem through entrepreneurial work, business training, seed funding, and other endeavors to grow the market.
