= Rebecca Enonchong =

Cameroonian technology entrepreneur

Rebecca Enonchong FREng
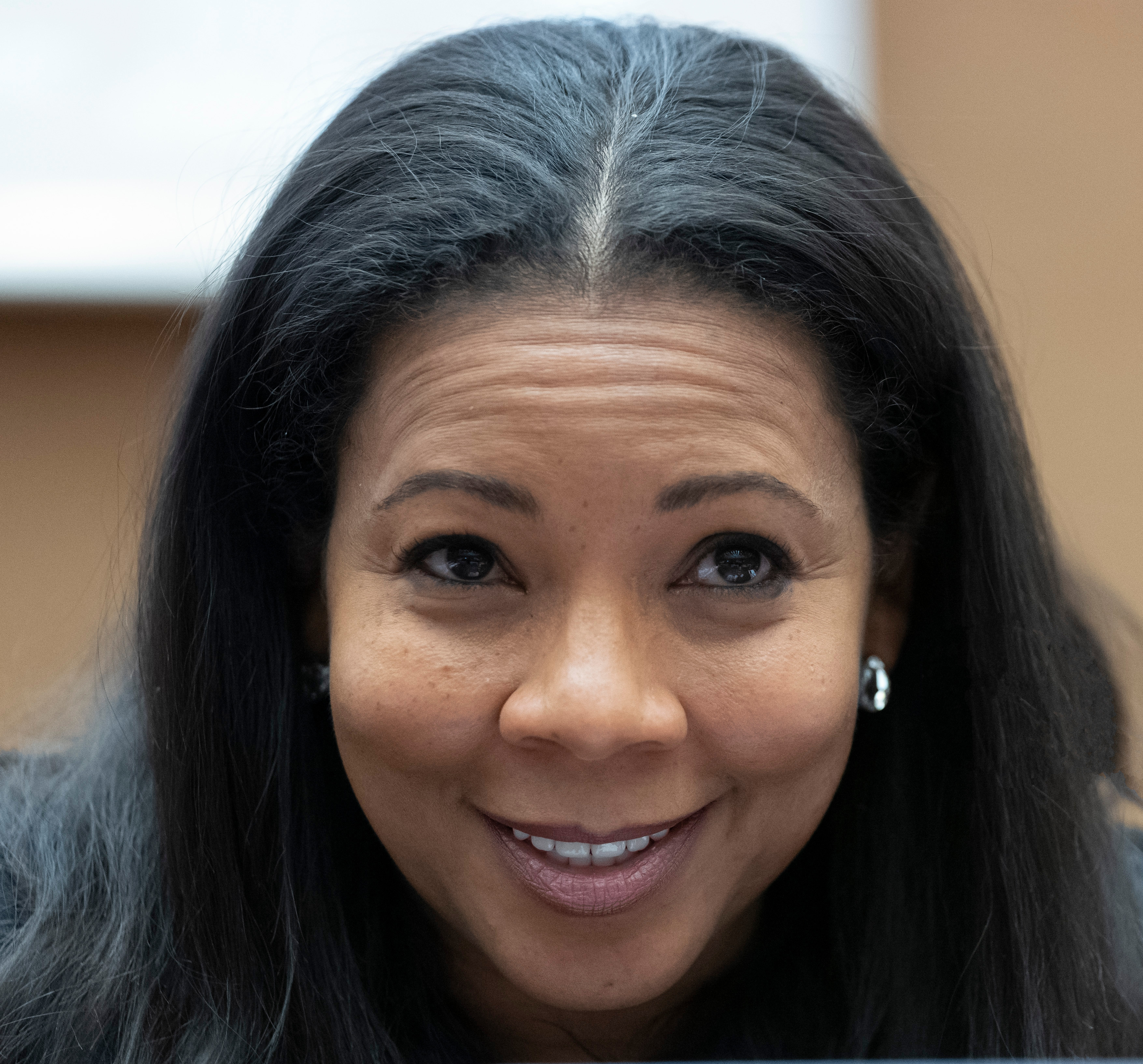
- Enonchong in 2019
- Born: 11 July 1967 (age 59); Southwest Region, Cameroon
- Education: Catholic University of America (BS, MS)
- Occupation: Technology entrepreneur
- Employer(s): AppsTech (founder and CEO)
- Known for: Promoting technology entrepreneurship in Africa
- Title: Vice-Chair of the International Chamber of Commerce (2026–)
- Parent: Henry Ndifor Abi Enonchong (father)

Rebecca Enonchong FREng (born 11 July 1967) is a Cameroonian technology entrepreneur, the founder and CEO of AppsTech. She is best known for her work promoting technology and start-ups in Africa, notably as chair of the board of AfriLabs, a pan-African network of innovation hubs.

Enonchong has received awards from organizations such as the World Economic Forum, and Forbes listed her among the 10 Female Tech Founders To Watch In Africa in 2014. In June 2026 she became a vice-chair of the International Chamber of Commerce (ICC).

== Biography ==
=== Early life and education ===
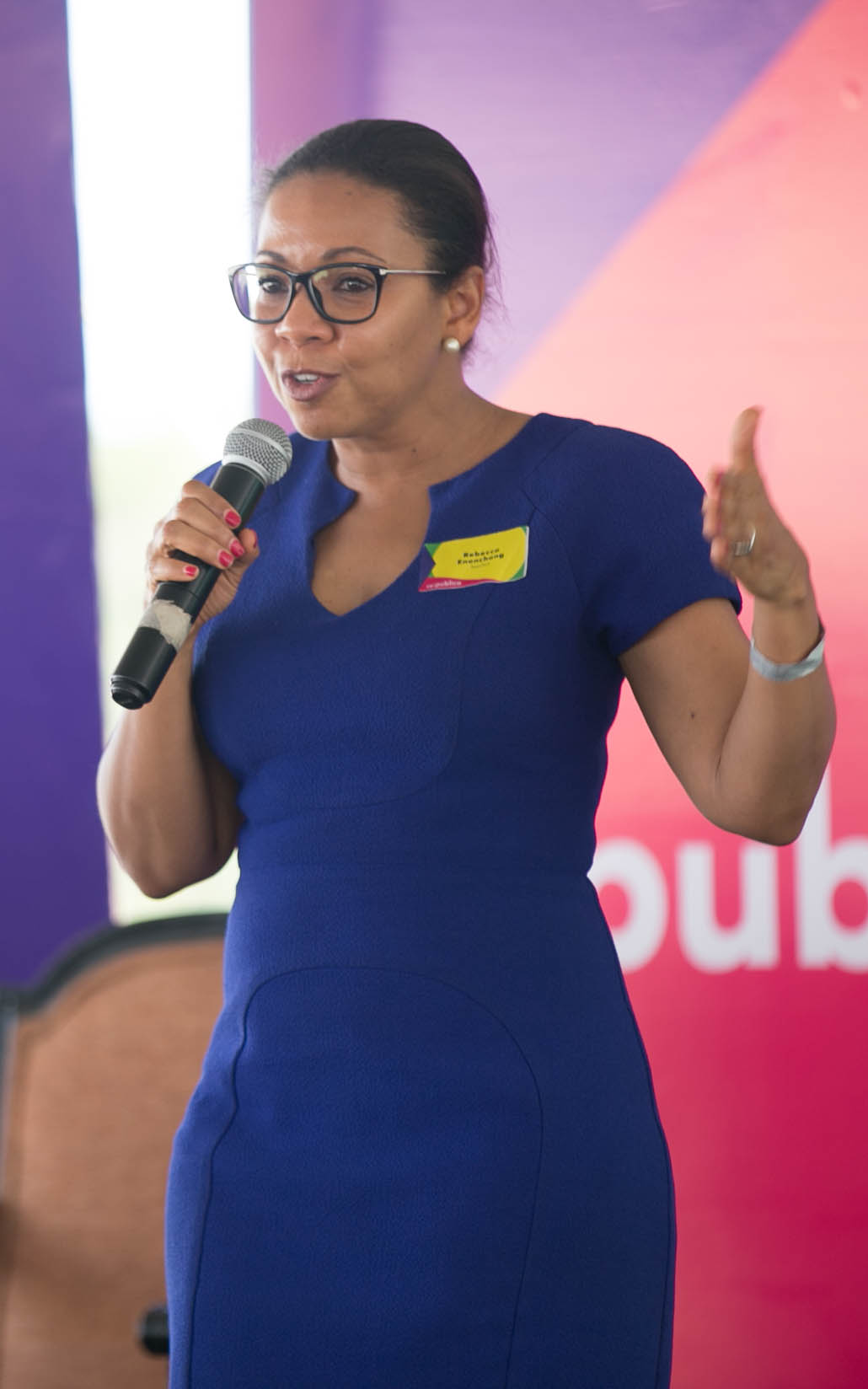
Enonchong in 2018

Enonchong was born on 11 July 1967 in the Southwest Region of Cameroon. Her father was Dr. Henry Ndifor Abi Enonchong, a well-known barrister in Cameroon, who helped create the Federal Cameroon Bar Association and its successor, the Cameroon Bar Association.

In her teens, Enonchong moved to the United States with her family. While studying, she took a job selling door-to-door newspaper subscriptions from the age of 15, and became a manager at the same company at the age of 17.

Enonchong attended the Catholic University of America, where she graduated with a Bachelor of Science and a Master of Science in economics.

=== Career ===
External videos
- "L'Afrique est en tête sur le paiement mobile", France 24, 15 May 2019 (in French)
- "Using your tool kit to push ahead", TEDxEuston, 3 March 2020

After finishing her education, Enonchong worked for a number of organizations including the Inter-American Development Bank (IDB) and Oracle Corporation.

In 1999, she founded AppsTech, a Bethesda, Maryland-based global provider of enterprise applications. AppsTech is an Oracle Platinum Partner and has customers in over 40 countries. The company opened offices in several countries, including Enonchong's native Cameroon. She has described that experience as difficult, and it led to the closure of AppsTech subsidiaries. She has said: "If a black African woman could succeed in America in 1999, then all the entrepreneurs across the world can succeed!"

In 2002, the World Economic Forum in Davos, Switzerland, named Enonchong a Global Leader for Tomorrow, along with other tech entrepreneurs such as Google co-founder Larry Page and Salesforce.com CEO Marc Benioff. In 2013, she was a finalist for the African Digital Woman award. In March 2014, Forbes listed her as one of the "10 Female Tech Founders to Watch in Africa".

Enonchong is one of the more followed sources of African tech news on Twitter, with over 200,000 followers in 2023; her handle, @Africatechie, has become her nickname in IT circles.

She chairs ActivSpaces, a technology hub and incubator in Buea, part of the ecosystem known as Silicon Mountain, a term she used publicly at a 2013 Barcamp conference. In March 2017 she was elected chair of the board of AfriLabs, the largest pan-African network of technology innovation hubs, and was re-elected in 2019. On 17 April 2019 she received the honorary Margaret award at the Journée de la Femme Digitale in Paris.

In August 2021, Enonchong was arrested in Douala and held for several days, reportedly accused of contempt towards the regional attorney general; her lawyers denounced a "serious abuse of authority" by the judicial system. She was released on 13 August 2021 after a social media campaign and announced that all charges had been dropped.

In June 2026, after four years on its executive board, Enonchong was appointed a vice-chair of the International Chamber of Commerce; according to Cameroonian media, she is the first African woman to hold the position.

== Non-profit work ==
Enonchong has spent much of her career promoting technology in Africa, both in the United States and in Africa. She was the founder and chair of the Africa Technology Forum, a non-profit dedicated to helping technology start-ups in Africa. In 2020, she was a judge for the Africa Prize For Engineering Innovation, when Charlette N'Guessan became the first woman to win the prize, for a technology that verifies the identity of African people.

Enonchong is a member of the board of directors of the Salesforce.com Foundation. She is on the board of VC4Africa, one of the largest online communities in Africa dedicated to entrepreneurs and investors. She is a member of the UK Department for International Development's Digital Advisory Panel, and was previously involved with the United Nations Women Global Advisory Committee and the UN ICT Task Force.

== Recognition ==
- World Economic Forum – Global Leader for Tomorrow (2002)
- Digital Women – African Digital Woman of the Year finalist (2013)
- WIE (Women, Inspiration and Enterprise Network) – 2013 WIE Africa Power Woman
- New African – 50 Leading Women in Business (2013)
- Black Enterprise – 2014 Women of Power
- IT News Africa – 10 Africans making waves in technology (2014)
- Forbes – 10 Female Tech Founders To Watch In Africa (2014)
- Journée de la Femme Digitale – honorary Margaret award (2019)
- Forbes – 50 Over 50: EMEA (2022)
- Business Insider – Female Leader of the Year in Africa (2022)
- Royal Academy of Engineering – International Fellow (2022)
- African Folder – African Female Founders You Should Know In 2023
