= Mediaboard =

Media monitoring company

Mediaboard s.r.o. is a technology company operating in media monitoring, media analysis and public relations tools. The company was established in Prague, Czechia in 2015 under the name Monitora Media s.r.o. It began using the Mediaboard brand in 2023, and its registered company name was also changed in April 2024.

Registered office of the company (Prague, Smichov, Nadrazni 32)

== Company information ==
Item	Details
Company name	Mediaboard s.r.o.
Legal form	Limited liability company
Established	13 April 2015
Registered office	Prague 5, Czech Republic
Coordinates	50°3′41.55″ N, 14°24′34″ E
Key people	Tomáš Berger, Michal Danilák
Business activities	Media monitoring, media analysis
Official	https://mediaboard.com/
Company registration number	03980481

== History ==
Monitora Media s.r.o. was founded in April 2015. Its Monitora service went live that same year as a tool for monitoring print publications, online media, radio and television, and for evaluating media coverage.

In 2018, the company acquired full ownership of Media Tenor’s media monitoring division. The transaction included taking over the division’s clients and some of its employees. Following the acquisition, the daily newspaper e15 described Monitora Media as the second-largest media monitoring provider in the Czech market.

In 2023, the company began using the Mediaboard brand. It linked the rebranding to the expansion of its original media monitoring focus to include media analytics and tools for communicating with journalists. Its legal name was changed from Monitora Media s.r.o. to Mediaboard s.r.o. in April 2024.

== International operations ==
The company gradually expanded its operations beyond the Czech Republic. It was already operating in Slovakia before adopting the Mediaboard brand.

In 2024, it opened offices in Poland and Croatia. According to the Czech News Agency, both were established as separate companies with local management. The company also operates in Ljubljana, Slovenia. Currently, it is also active in Hungary and Serbia.

== Products and services ==
The company initially focused on media monitoring and evaluating media coverage across print publications, online media, radio and television. It subsequently expanded its services to include social media monitoring, media analysis and tools for media relations (Media monitoring service).

Mediaboard’s products, delivered as web applications, are used by companies such as Avast, Google, Seznam, IKEA, Samsung and Škoda, as well as hundreds of others. They are also used by public bodies, including the City of Prague and the Ministry of Defence of the Czech Republic.

== Awards and rankings ==
In 2020, Monitora Media ranked 21st in the Deloitte Technology Fast 50 Central Europe ranking, with reported growth of 961%.
