= Esther Kimani =

Kenyan engineer

- Occupation: CEO
- Known for: winning the 2024 Africa Prize For Engineering Innovation

Esther Kimani is a Kenyan engineer who developed a method of identifying diseases in crops using image analysis. Her awards included the 2024 Africa Prize For Engineering Innovation.

== Biography ==
Kimani was brought up in a farming family in a rural community in the mountains of Nyandarua in Kenya. She remembers how their crops could be lost to disease or how other farmers would spend money to apply the wrong chemical in fear of a ravaged crop. Farmers usually lose a third of their crop to diseases or pests in Kenya.

On 8 September 2022, she was invited to an award ceremony where the Rwandan president Paul Kagame was a guest. It was the Africa Food Prize Awards Ceremony and she and Mark Musinguzi, founder of Hya Bioplastics in Uganda, shared the main prize of Ksh 6 million. She was also the 2022 Youth Adapt Winner.

In 2024, Kimani was the winner of the Africa Prize For Engineering Innovation. Because it was the award's tenth year she was awarded £50,000 which was twice the usual amount. Norah Magero had won the award so Kimani was the second winner from Kenya. Kimani had developed a method of identifying diseases in crops using image analysis. Losses were said to be reduced by 30% and the yield at harvest was increased by 40%. The cost of the device was low at three dollars a month and it made more inspections than could be done in person. Moreover the device not only notified the farmer but it also informed those overseeing farming so they could be aware of a problem in a specific area.

The three runners up included another Kenyan, Kevin Maina. He had created roof tiles from recycled plastic. The other two runners up were Rory Assandey from Côte d'Ivoire and Ugandan Martin Tumusiime.

== Awards and honours ==
- 2024 Africa Prize For Engineering Innovation
