= Buzz monitoring =

Buzz monitoring is the monitoring of consumer responses to commercial services and products in order to establish the marketing buzz surrounding a new or existing offer. Similar to media monitoring, it is becoming increasingly popular as a base for strategic insight development alongside other forms of market research.

Buzz monitoring involves the checking and analysis of myriad online sources such as internet forums, blogs, and social networks. Data can be provided in real time, which means that critical issues can be picked up instantly. It is also comparatively inexpensive compared to other market research tools and can actually guide further product and service developments. Influence is a key question in buzz monitoring – does this particular person and/or this particular piece of content matter and is it influencing others? Hence, the influence of a source is an important buzz monitoring metric that should be benchmarked.

Buzz monitoring is implemented by businesses for a variety of reasons, namely to improve efficiency, reaction times and identify future opportunities. Insights gained can help guide marketing and communications, identify positive and negative customer experiences, assess product and service demand, tackle crisis management, round off competitor analysis, establish brand equity and predict market share.

== Tools ==
In the era of the technological prosperity, social networks have become an essential tool for buzz monitoring, due to the large scale of opinions and information shared between users. Recently, the growing interest in monitoring and scrutinizing opinions shared online was the subject of a TREC Conference. One of the main advantages of using social networks for buzz monitoring is price availability, as this method could be considered cheap compared to other sources of information. Many types of social networks have added specific features which allow people to observe the online activity of their friends or followers. One of the first examples is the "Hot Topics" section on Blogspot, which was added to the website in 2009. Other social networks, including Google with "Google Alerts", Facebook, Twitter and Yahoo have also added similar services. Twitter, which uses the micro-blogging platform, could be reasonably considered as one of the most powerful free tool for buzz monitoring. With its micro-blogging facilities, users can share their thoughts quickly and promptly, view the latest trending topics, and search the profiles of people without the need to "follow" them. Other widely used tools such as Mention, Alterian-SM2, BrandWatch and Converseon are designed specifically for monitoring information. These online tools are not available for free; however, they provide more features and are more complicated and sophisticated than online platforms such as Google Alerts. When deciding which tool would better suit a specific product, one needs to carefully consider some features, such as which market segment one wants to consider and what type of data one is expecting to collect. For example, if someone wished to define the strategy for the future, they would probably be looking for the tool that allows them to track information during the past several months or years. The collected information can then be restrained using data analysis tools, built on Structured Query Language (SQL) for later use.

== Types of buzz ==
The direct correlation between the consumer response and the success of the brand or product has recently been determined. The buzz around the certain product can be divided into several groups: positive buzz, sometimes called "white buzz", negative buzz, also called "black buzz", and neutral buzz. The white and the black buzz correspondingly can be calculated using binaryEnotion and following formulas:

White Buzz = (Positive > (Neutral + Negative))
Black Buzz = (Negative > (Neutral + Positive))

The abovementioned notations can be best described by the assumption that the white buzz is formed when the total amount of positive comments is greater than the sum of neutral and negative ones. The same can be applied in the case of the black buzz. To obtain more accurate data, it might be prudent to search as much information as possible, as the correctness of data is directly proportional to the amount of the consumers' responses examined. Recent studies have indicated that the impact of negative comments tends to be higher than that of positive ones, as they think they are more credible. However, it might depend on customer's reaction on different type of comments. People are also more inclined to share a negative experience than a positive one in order to raise public awareness and prevent their friends and relatives from using the same service. Thus, it might be recommended for a big company to reduce the black buzz around the product or brand rather than increasing the amount of positive comments.

== Effects ==
Buzz, also sometimes referred to as a "word-of-mouth phenomenon", has always been around and can have a great effect on a product's reputation. While advertisements get more obsolete and hard to understand, communication between the user and producer is becoming more and more common. Managers of the company should always be aware of the buzz surrounding their product, work in cooperation with the audience and be constantly prepared to stop any enormous negative attack from the core. Having collected all necessary information from the customers, managers should compare the functioning in the market of their own product to the competitor's one and to determine the further strategy, defining strong and weak sides of the product.

As suggested, there are exactly two pathways of the response to an online buzz from the different point of views. Managers of the companies affected by an existing buzz would try to reduce or increase the costs of the product depending on what kind of reviews they have received; they also might try to improve the service or goods in case of prevailing amount of negative opinions. Customers would likewise make their decisions about the product, deciding to either buy it in future or avoid further usage. Both pathways directly affect the company's profitability and brand image. When used in the right way, buzz monitoring could also increase the public awareness of the product.

However, there are also some disadvantages linked to buzz monitoring. As online buzz is getting more important and easy to access, marketing agents are trying to increase the ratio of positive reviews and to create the great amount of buzz around the certain product or service they need to sell in order to increase the profit and public awareness.
