= IceRocket =

IceRocket was an Internet search engine which specialized in real-time search. Based in Dallas, Texas, it launched in 2004 hoping to market itself solely through word of mouth.

IceRocket was backed by Mark Cuban and headquartered in Dallas, Texas. The company has received angel funding from Mr. Cuban.

== History and growth ==
Icerocket launched in 2004. The search engine originally launched with features designed to make web searches on a PDA much easier, for instance allowing users to email a query to the engine and receive their results back in response. Icerocket had an early licensing deal with Gofish.com.

In August 2011, it was announced that IceRocket had been acquired by the Meltwater Group.

== Service ==
IceRocket was generally for blog searches but expanded into searching the popular social networking websites Twitter and Facebook as well as allowing searching of news and the World Wide Web. IceRocket's Big Buzz feature allows users to search Blogs, Tweets, news, images etc. all from one page.

The IceRocket site was a free resource for people looking to monitor their brand, it was ad supported. IceRocket had an API that it licenses to social media monitoring firms as well as PR agencies.

== Closure ==
The site is no longer active.

== See also ==
- Bloglines
- BlogScope
- Technorati
