= Marketing buzz =

Interaction which amplifies marketing message

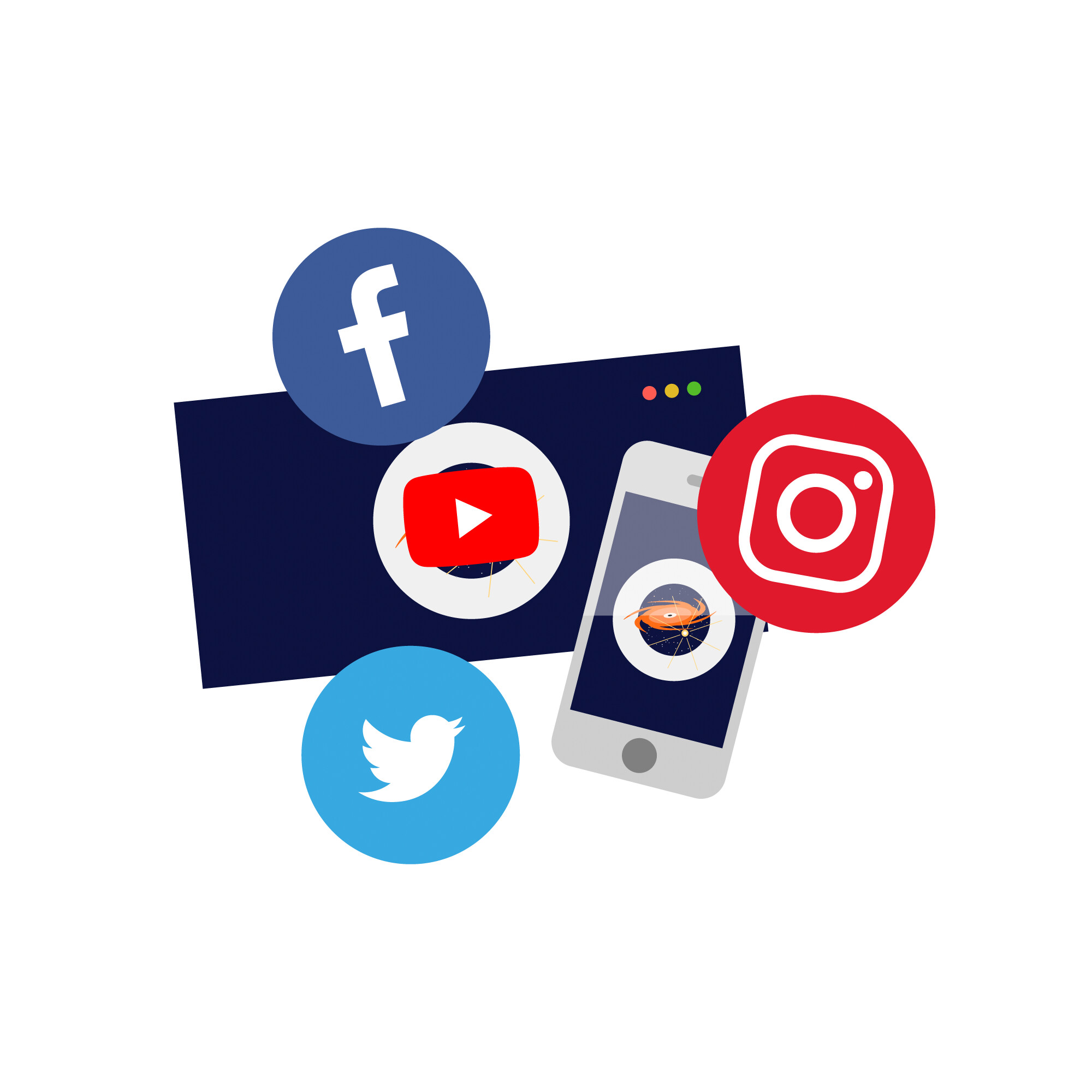
Various social media platforms are often utilized to generate marketing buzz.

Marketing buzz or simply buzz—a term used in viral marketing—is the interaction of consumers and users with a product or service which amplifies or alters the original marketing message. This emotion, energy, excitement, or anticipation about a product or service can be positive or negative. Buzz can be generated by intentional marketing activities by the brand owner or it can be the result of an independent event that enters public awareness through social or traditional media such as newspapers. Marketing buzz originally referred to oral communication but in the age of social media, platforms such as Facebook, X, Instagram, TikTok and YouTube are now the dominant communication channels for marketing buzz.

== Strategies ==
Some of the common tactics used to create buzz include creating suspense around a launch or event, controversial messaging, and collaborating with bloggers and social media influencers.

Influencers with a large following have the potential to amplify both positive and negative messages to the target audience, depending on their reputation within the community. Therefore, a successful social media campaign must find, and engage with influencers that are positively inclined to the brand, providing them with product information and incentives to forward it on to the community. Partnership with influencers do however have the potential lead to public backlash. For example, in 2023, Bud Light's collaboration with social media personality Dylan Mulvaney resulted virality and negative buzz for Bud Light after Dylan recorded a sponsorship post with the beer company on social media. The widespread reactions resulted in one of the largest boycotts in American history. This example of social media marketing buzz demonstrated how brand perception can be effected when buzz reaches outside of a brand's intended audience.

Development of a social media marketing strategy must also take into account interaction with traditional media including the potential both for synergies, where the two combine to greater effect, and cannibalism, where one takes market from the other, leading to no real market expansion. This can be seen in the growing connection between marketing buzz and traditional television broadcasts. Shows monitor buzz, encouraging audience participation on social media during broadcasts, and in 2013 the Nielsen ratings were expanded to include social media rankings based on Twitter buzz.

In the U.S., many large companies promote through the Super Bowl to generate quick marketing buzz. Budweiser’s Super Bowl advertising has been the most successful at generating buzz as measured by the USA Today Super Bowl Ad Meter survey over its 26-year history, most likely due to its use of emotional stories, to stir the positive emotions of audiences across a wide range of demographics. The most buzz will be generated in a “sweet spot” where the topic is interesting enough to invite comment, but not controversial enough to keep people away. There is substantial risk of generating negative buzz when using controversy. For example, Coca-Cola’s 2014 It’s Beautiful ad that aired during the Super Bowl and generated substantial backlash.

== Measurement ==
Two common terms used to describe buzz are volume, which quantifies the number of interchanges related to a product or topic in a given time period, and rating or level, a more qualitative measure of the positive or negative sentiment or amount of engagement associated with the product. Basic social media measures of buzz volume include visits, views, mentions, followers and subscribers. Next level measures such as shares, replies, clicks, re-tweets, comments and wall posts provide a better indication of the participants' engagement levels because they require action in response to an initial communication, and is often how engagement is measured.

It is possible for firms to track the marketing buzz of their products online using buzz monitoring. Buzz monitoring can be used to assess the performance of marketing strategies as well as quickly identify negative buzz or product issues that require a response. It can also be used to identify and capitalize on current trends that will shift consumer behaviors. For example the low-carb diet was buzzing months before sales at grocery stores reflected the trend. Monitoring buzz around certain topics can be used as an anonymous equivalent of a traditional focus group in new product development. For some companies it is important to understand the buzz surrounding a product before committing to the market.

== Positive vs. Negative Buzz ==
Positive "buzz" is often a goal of viral marketing, public relations, and advertising on Web 2.0 media. It occurs when high levels of individual engagement on social media drive the buzz volume up for positive associations with the product or brand. Positive marketing buzz gains the attention of consumers and media easily because the information is perceived as entertaining, fascinating, or even newsworthy. Examples of products with strong positive marketing buzz upon introduction are Harry Potter, Volkswagen's New Beetle, Pokémon, Beanie Babies, and The Blair Witch Project.

Negative buzz can result from events that generate bad associations with the product in the mind of the public, such as a product safety recall, unintended consequences of ill-advised marketing strategies, and even including controversial influencers in marketing campaigns. If not swiftly counteracted, negative buzz can be harmful to a product's success and the most social network savvy organizations prepare for these eventualities. Another well-known instance of negative marketing buzz occurred in 2025 with an American Eagle Outfitters ad featuring Sydney Sweeney. The campaign slogan "Sydney Sweeney has great jeans" used wordplay with "jeans" and "genes", which many viewers associated with genetic superiority and eugenics. American Eagle had to later release a statement, claiming that their only intent was to promote their denim.

== Effectiveness ==
Buzz works as a marketing tool because individuals in social settings are easier to trust than organizations that may be perceived to have vested interests in promoting their products and/or services. Interpersonal communication has been shown to be more effective in influencing consumers’ purchasing decisions than advertising alone and the two combined have the greatest power.

A 2013 paper by Xueming Luo and Jie Zhang lists numerous previous studies that have shown a positive correlation between buzz rating and/or volume and product sales or company revenue. To expand further on that research, Luo and Zhang investigated the relationship of buzz and web traffic and their effect on stock market performance for nine top publicly traded firms in the computer hardware and software industries. Comparing data on consumer buzz rating and volume from a popular electronic product review Website with the firms’ stock returns over the same period, they found a strong positive correlation between online buzz and stock performance. They also found that due to increasing online content and limitations in consumer attention, competing buzz for rival products could have a negative effect on a firm's performance. For these nine companies, buzz had a greater effect than traffic and accounted for approximately 11% of the total variation of stock returns, with 6% due to the firms’ own marketing driving the stock price up and 5% due to rival firms’ buzz driving it down.

As consumers increasingly expect to have access to buzz about products as part of their purchasing decisions and to interact with the brand in social media, successful companies are being driven to adopt social media marketing strategies to stay competitive. To successfully plan and implement these campaigns requires the ability to predict their effectiveness and therefore the return on investment that can be expected for the dollars expended.

== Marketing Buzz in the Digital Age ==
With the addition of new interactive and digital media technologies into the marketing industry, a significant emphasis has been put on the use of online content to generate buzz about a product, service, or company. Companies well known for this practice are Amazon and Netflix, both of which utilize individual customer patterns and usage trends on these sites to cater the customers' future experiences on the site around the individuals. As a result, this works towards one of the main goals of buzz marketing, to provide each customer with a unique experience that motivates them to purchase a product.

Additionally, the social media site Twitter has been a game changer in terms of marketing buzz in the digital age. The online microblogging site, with web traffic totalling about 350,000 tweets being sent per minute, has quickly become an important tool in business and in marketing. Companies are now creating Twitter pages as a means of personal communication with their target audience. Twitter allows businesses of any size to speak directly to their intended demographic, and allows the customer to communicate back, a feature unique to marketing technologies and methods utilized in the digital age. In addition, companies can pay to have their tweets show up on the Twitter "timeline" of users they want to reach. Many celebrities and public figures carrying a large amount of Twitter "followers" also accept payment to tweet about products.

Some notable examples of buzz marketing in the digital age include the highly successful marketing campaign for the third season of the AMC series Mad Men. The TV channel created an online avatar maker that allowed fans of the show to create an online version of themselves in the 1960s style portrayed on the show. The site experienced over half a million users in the first week and has since been updated to promote consecutive seasons. The campaign gave the show some of its highest ratings seen up to that point. Another successful viral buzz marketing campaign surrounded the 2007 "found footage" motion picture Paranormal Activity. The small budget film was originally released to only select cities. A trailer was then released to the public with the ending calling individuals to go online and "demand" the movie be brought to a city near them. Once a city was demanded enough times, the film would be screened in theatres in that city. The success of this movie can be credited to this marketing campaign, which worked on the principle of "we always want what we don't have".

== Transparency and Ethical Concerns ==
While many companies are also using their online presence to generate buzz by allowing users to post reviews on their sites, there can be transparency concerns regarding this type of marketing. The concept of online reviewing has the potential to generate negative buzz, which companies do not want. Online review site Yelp has been subject to criticism after allegations that business owners were paying the site to only publish the positive reviews, in an attempt to boost sales and hide negative buzz about these businesses. After 10 small businesses filed a lawsuit against Yelp in 2010, the site made the decision to remove the "Favourite Review" option, that previously allowed a business owner to choose the review they liked the most and have it showcased, as well as made content previously hidden from potential customers, visible.

When it comes to consumers and live buzz marketing, they respond more positively to campaigns that provide the most transparency and can typically sense when something seems "too good to be true". Also, people prefer when the marketing isn't secretive, or conducted by someone who presents themselves as an ordinary person. When the method of buzz marketing appears "peer-to-peer" but in reality is not, consumers say that the marketing feels deceptive, sneaky and deterring. While the tactic does not seem to cross any legal boundaries, it is deceitful marketing. Companies must be mindful of the legality of transparency concerns in buzz marketing, but they must also be mindful of the consumer distrust that can come from the lack of transparency.
