= Owler =

American technology company

Owler, Inc.
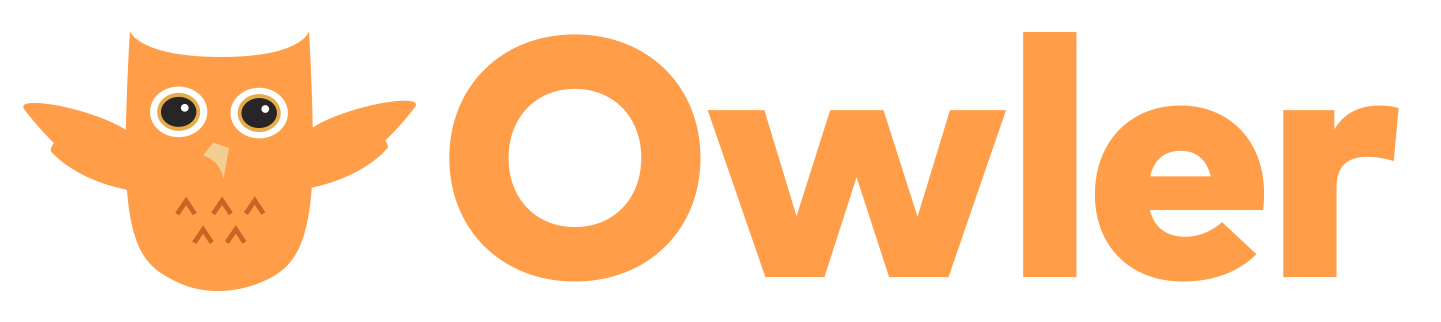
- Formerly: InfoArmy, Inc.
- Type: Subsidiary
- Industry: Internet services
- Founded: 2011; 15 years ago
- Founder: Jim Fowler; Rajan Madhavan; Tim Harsch
- Key people: Tim Harsch (CEO); Jim Fowler (Chairman)
- Revenue: US$3.3 million
- Number of employees: 88
- Parent: Meltwater
- Website: owler.com

Owler is an American Internet company headquartered in San Mateo, California. It crowdsources competitive insights by providing news alerts, company profiles, and polls and allows members to follow, track, and research companies in real time.

The company was founded in 2011 and has over 3.5 million active users. In June 2021, it was acquired by Meltwater.

== History ==
InfoArmy was founded in 2011 by Jim Fowler, Rajan Madhavan, and Tim Harsch. Fowler previously founded Jigsaw (later called Data.com), another crowdsourcing Data as a Service platform that was sold for 175M to Salesforce in 2010.

InfoArmy launched publicly in June 2012, and had 28 employees as of October 23, 2012.

InfoArmy began as a crowdsourcing model where two-person research teams would compile one report on each company. Most researchers were stay-at-home parents, freelance workers, and international BPO workers. Access to InfoArmy's reports cost $99 for a year-long subscription and three quarterly reports.

In January 2013, InfoArmy announced that its business model would not be sustainable in the long term.

On February 1, 2013, InfoArmy relaunched as Owler, Inc. using a different business model. Owler offers a free mobile and online platform for company information and interactive business news. Members can choose to "follow" a set of companies, and Owler provides a personalized newsfeed and daily email summary of the latest news on those companies. Owler members can also sign up to receive immediate notifications when major business events (such as funding, acquisitions, or leadership changes) occur. The competitive intelligence featured on Owler comes from two primary places: it is both hand-curated by Owler employees from sources across the web, and crowdsourced from Owler users. Unlike other business information services, Owler polls its members to gauge market sentiment and current trends.

On June 18, 2021, Owler entered into an agreement to be acquired by software as a service company, Meltwater, for $18.9 million in cash and $5.6 million in Meltwater equity.

== Funding ==
Owler is backed by Norwest Venture Partners and Trinity Ventures, two venture capital firms based in Silicon Valley, California. On Oct. 23, 2012, the company raised $17.3 million in Series B venture capital, bringing its funding to $19.3 million. Owler has raised a total of $30.8 millionin funding over four rounds.

As part of the COVID-19 pandemic, the company received between $350,000 and $1 million in federally backed small business loan from Silicon Valley Bank as part of the Paycheck Protection Program. The company stated it would allow them to retain zero jobs.

== Products and technology ==
Owler offers a number of different services, including two email products as well as a browser-based web platform.

=== Web platform ===
Members can view their personalized newsfeed on the browser-based platform, which can be accessed via computer or smartphone. They can also view company profiles, edit profile information, and take polls through the web platform.

The web version also gives members access to lists that contain data about major events, such as funding rounds or acquisitions.

=== Daily Snapshot ===
Owler's Daily Snapshot provides users with the latest news events in their industry. Owler curates the most relevant news and blog posts from within the last 24 hours, surfacing stories on that member's company, competitors, and prospects. Each Daily Snapshot is personalized to a user's Competitive Graph and based on the companies that user follows.

=== Instant Insights ===
Owler emails users an Instant Insight anytime one of fifteen trigger events occur, including funding, acquisition, or leadership change. Users follow competitors, customers, prospects, and vendors, and Owler instantly sends full report hot anytime breaking events occur. This email features: company description, competitive landscape, and what people are saying.

=== Competitive Graph ===
Owler's Competitive Graph maps the relationship between companies. It was created by Owler's 3.5+ million members who regularly update their competitors (as well as provide estimates on critical data fields like revenue/employee numbers, CEO ratings, etc.). The Competitive Graph maps how closely companies compete with one another, allowing Owler to rank competitors. The Competitive Graph powers all of Owler's products, allowing the company to provide highly personalized email alerts and feeds.

== Leadership ==
=== Leadership team ===
- Tim Harsch, CEO and co-founder
- James F. Fowler, founder and executive chairman
- Stephanie Vinella, CFO
- Dhruv Gupta, Director of Product
- John Duffy, Director of Engineering
- Derrick Jenkins, Director of Marketing

=== Board of directors ===
- James F. Fowler, founder and chairman of the board
- Tim Harsch, founder and CEO
- Jeff Crowe (Norwest Venture Partners)
- Patrick Spain (Newser, First Stop Health)
