= Charlette N'Guessan =

Ivorian software engineer, tech entrepreneur and writer

- Born: Charlette Desirée N'Guessan c.1994
- Education: Meltwater Entrepreneurial School of Technology
- Occupation: software entrepreneur
- Employer: BACE Group
- Known for: first woman to win the Africa Prize For Engineering Innovation

Charlette Desirée N'Guessan is an Ivorian software engineer, tech entrepreneur and writer. She founded BACE Group and was the first woman to win the Africa Prize for Engineering Innovation for creating BACE API, an image recognition and identity verification system.

== Life ==
N'Guessan was born in about 1994. Charlotte's name is not unusual in her family as all of her five sisters have that name. She studied at the Meltwater Entrepreneurial School of Technology in Accra which is where the idea for the software was first developed. In 2018 she created her company BACE group.

N'Guessan was living in Ghana when she became the first woman to win the annual Africa Award for Engineering Innovation awarded by the British Royal Academy of Engineering, in the 2020 competition to showcase engineering science. After being the first African woman to receive this award, she also raised the honor of Ghana being the first to reach this high level. N'Guessan won the award because of the technology she and her team created BACE API, a technology that identifies African people. The announcement was made by the Cameroonian entrepreneur Rebecca Enonchong on behalf of the judges. This technology has been made wise in order to be identified and evaluated through thinking and wisdom in an easy way, which the public and many companies have been satisfied. The technology can verify a person's original photo or video taken on a cell phone and quickly identify the target.

The BACE API software uses Ghanaian Passports and other documents for authentication and verification. This relied on good cooperation with the officials who are in charge of this part of the country's government. The technology was created to help companies that rely on personal identification. Two Ghanaian companies are using the software to identify their customers.

When she achieved this success, she received an award and praise, including from the minister of Africa in the UK, James Duddridge. In 2023 her software was abandoned commercially when they realised that they faced a number of difficult challenges.

Guessan decided to stay with her expertise in AI despite it being a male dominated industry. In 2024 she was working on the problem of data scarcity in Africa while looking at the general problems faced during the technology's adoption.

== Writing ==
- Space Fostering African Societies: Developing the African Continent through Space, Part 1 - contribution to Annette Froehlich's 2019 book
- She discusses "AI Opportunities in the African Financial Sector" in "The AI Book: The Artificial Intelligence Handbook for Investors, Entrepreneurs and FinTech Visionaries", 2020
