= Norah Magero =

Kenyan mechanical engineer

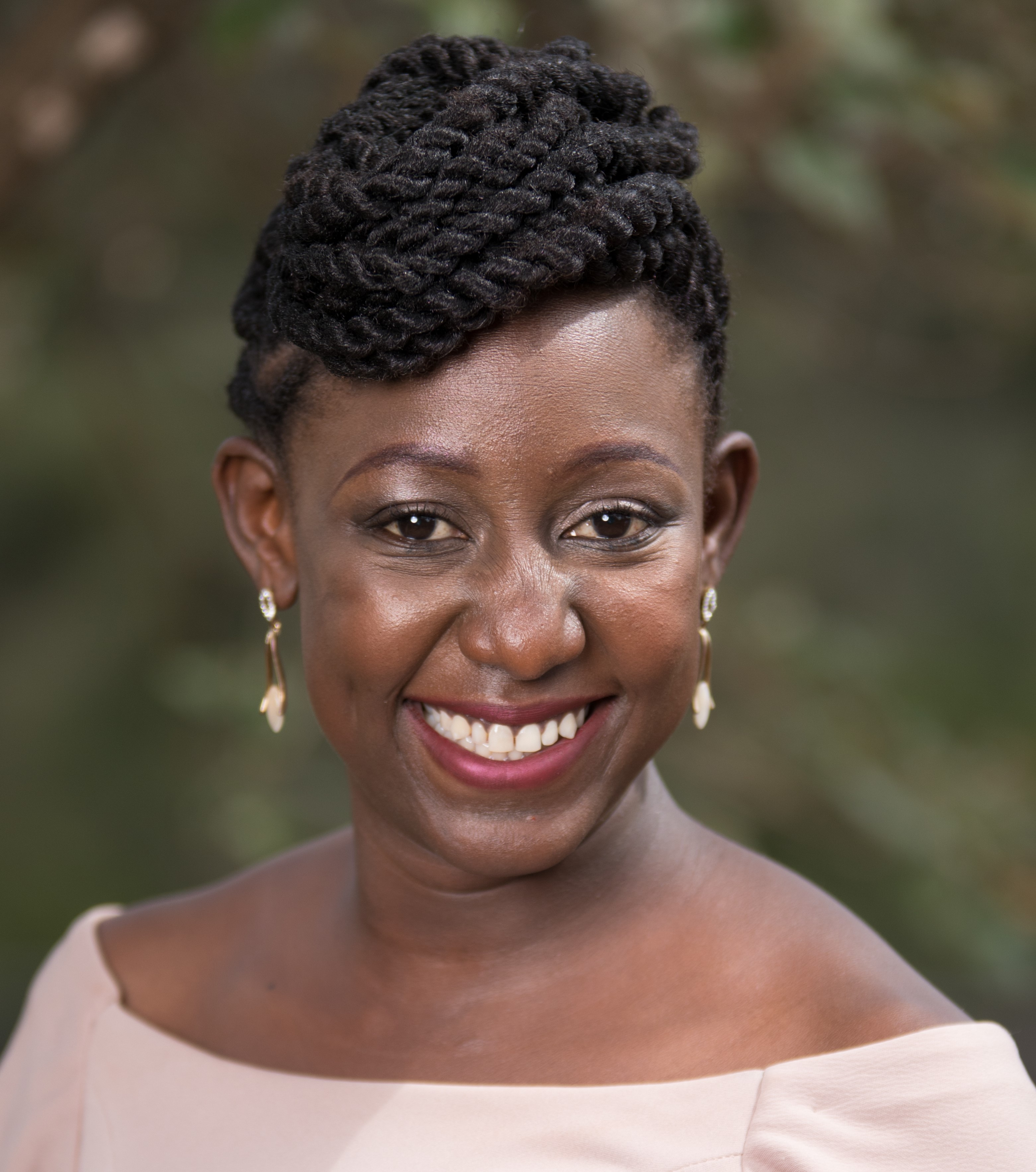
- Born: Norah Apondi Magero; November 22, 1988 (age 37); Kenya
- Education: University of Nairobi (BSc Mechanical and Manufacturing Engineering)
- Occupations: Mechanical Engineer, Renewable Energy Expert
- Employer: Drop Access
- Known for: Developing solar-powered healthcare refrigerator for vaccines Winning the 2022 Africa Prize For Engineering Innovation
- Spouse: James Nthale Mulatya (m. 2017)
- Children: 2

Norah Magero (born November 22, 1988) is a Kenyan mechanical engineer and renewable energy expert. She is the co-founder and CEO of Drop Access, a social enterprise that provides affordable and practical energy solutions for rural and underserved communities. She is widely recognized for developing the VacciBox, a solar-powered portable refrigerator designed to store and transport vaccines and other temperature-sensitive medical supplies in remote areas. She is the first Kenyan and second woman globally to win the Africa Prize for Engineering Innovation by the Royal Academy of Engineering.

== Early life and career ==
Norah Magero was born in Kisumu on November 22, 1988. She attended the University of Nairobi where she graduated in 2014 with a degree in Bachelor of Science in Mechanical and Manufacturing Engineering. In 2016, she co-founded the Cool Green Campaign, an initiative promoting clean energy adoption in Kenyan high schools. As part of the campaign, she led the installation of one of the first solar PV systems at Starehe Girls' Centre. The campaign also provided STEM mentorship, inspiring students to explore renewable energy technologies.

== Drop Access and the VacciBox ==
Norah Magero co-founded Drop Access to address energy challenges in rural areas. She realized that without constant electricity, reliable refrigeration for vaccines was impossible, which meant vaccines quickly became useless. Collaborating with a medic, she developed a solar-powered small fridge prototype, which led to the creation of the VacciBox.

The VacciBox is a 50-litre portable, solar-powered refrigerator designed for healthcare use. It can be carried on motorbikes, bicycles, or boats, making it ideal for remote regions. While Magero's team was able to quickly manufacture additional fridges, they initially lacked the organization and funding for large-scale distribution.

Their start-up received assistance from organizations such as the German outfit Startup Energy and the RES4Africa Foundation. With their support, VacciBoxes were installed in four medical centers, where they could keep items cold for up to 10 hours and track deliveries in real-time.

=== Field trials and impact ===
The first trial of the VacciBox took place at Merrueshi Village, southeast of Nairobi, which serves as the only health center for 400,000 people. The center reported a 150% increase in vaccinations, as the VacciBox allowed healthcare workers to take vaccines directly to patients in remote areas. Under Magero's leadership, Drop Access has scaled operations to serve communities in Tanzania, Zambia, Zimbabwe, and Ivory Coast.

== Achievements and tecognition ==
In 2022, Magero was one of 16 African engineers selected to compete in the Africa Prize for Engineering Innovation by the Royal Academy of Engineering. Over a seven-month period, participants received extensive mentorship and support. At the end of the program, three finalists received £10,000 each, while Magero, the winner, was awarded £25,000. Judge Alessandra Buonanno praised her innovation's potential to revolutionize healthcare in rural Kenya.

In April 2024, Magero was recognized as a TED Fellow, granting her access to the TED community, mentorship, and training opportunities.

Magero's other recognitions include:

- IFC She Wins Africa Fellow.
- Alumna of the Young African Leaders Initiative (YALI), United Nations Institute for Training and Research (UNITAR), Microgrid Academy by RES4Africa Foundation, Future Females Business School by UK-Kenya Tech Hub, TechWomen, and Acumen.
- Women in Energy Philanthropy Award (2017).
- Social Impact Award and Energy Champion of the Year Award (2020, World Energy Day Kenya).
- Microgrid Academy Award (2020, RES4Africa Foundation).
- Innovation Award (2021, Africa Queen of Energy).
- Excellence in Entrepreneurship Award (2023, DIAR Awards).
- Engineering Innovation Award (2023, Institute of Engineers Kenya).
- Top 40 Under 40 Women in Kenya (2024, Business Daily Africa).

== Media features and public recognition ==
Magero's work has been featured in prominent publications such as The Guardian, BBC, CNN, Bloomberg TV, Euro News, and Ingenia UK. She was also recognized on the UK Tube Map during the UK's National Engineering Day in 2023. Her contributions to energy access have been publicly commended by leaders, including former President of Kenya, Uhuru Kenyatta, and USAID Administrator Samantha Power.

== Professional affiliations ==
Norah serves in various leadership roles:

- Member of the Council of Engineers for the Energy Transition (CEET), reporting to the UN Secretary-General.
- Board member of the RES4Africa Foundation.

== Personal life ==
In 2017, Norah married fellow mechanical engineer James Nthale Mulatya. They have two children.
