= Africa Prize For Engineering Innovation =

Royal Academy of Engineering award

- Awarded for: Exceptional contributions to engineering
- Sponsored by: Royal Academy of Engineering
- Date: 2014
- Country: United Kingdom
- Presented by: Royal Academy of Engineering
- Reward: £25,000
- Website: africaprize.raeng.org.uk

The Africa Prize For Engineering Innovation is an award for excellence in engineering in Sub-Saharan Africa. Eight months are set aside to help the contestants. The winner is awarded £25,000, with the second, third and fourth runners-up gaining £10,000 each.

== History ==
The award was introduced in January 2014 by the Royal Academy of Engineering in the United Kingdom. Competitor engineers must be from Sub-Saharan Africa.

In 2024 Esther Kimani was the winner of the prize and, because it was the award's tenth year, she was awarded £50,000. She was second winner from Kenya. Kimani had developed a method of identifying diseases in crops using image analysis.

A web based App that translates speech to sign language in real-time took the 2025 "Africa Prize For Engineering Innovation. The app was called Terp 360 and it was developed by Elly Savatia from Kenya. The speech is translated by AI in real-time to be performed by 3D avatars. The development included over 2,000 local signs in order that it could be adopted easily.

== Benefits ==
Sixteen competitors are selected and they are given any support they need during the competition and beyond to deliver their projects. These competitors receive training and support and they get the opportunity to improve their networking. The winner receives £25,000 and the second, third and fourth places are awarded £10,000.

== Award recipients ==
- 2015 Dr. Askwar Hilonga and team of Tanzania
- 2016 Arthur Zang of Cameroon
- 2017 Godwin Benson of Nigeria
- 2018 Brian Gitta and his team from Uganda
- 2019 Neo Hutiri from South Africa
- 2020 Charlette N'Guessan from Ghana
- 2021 Noël N'guessan from Ivory Coast
- 2022 Norah Magero from Kenya
- 2023 Anatoli Kirigwajjo from Uganda
- 2023 Edmund Wessels from South Africa
- 2024 Esther Kimani, Kenya
- Elly Savatia Kenya
