= Efiwe.org =

US non-profit organization

Efiwe.org is a 501 (c)(3) non-profit organization based in Edwardsville, Illinois, whose goal is to send one million books to libraries in post-secondary schools across Africa.

== Founding ==
The organisation was co-founded in 2017 as a nonprofit organisation by Philip Alabi, then a graduate student of chemistry at Southern Illinois University Edwardsville after a successful book drive in 2016 during which about 900 books were collected at and around Southern Illinois University Edwardsville and sent to Alabi's alma mater in Nigeria, the Tai Solarin University of Education.

Efiwe's stated goal is to collect college books in the U.S. and send to tertiary institutions libraries or community libraries in Africa.

== Board ==
The non-profit is supported by a board of trustees which includes students, professors, and book enthusiasts.
