= Media monitoring =

Activity of monitoring the output of the print, online and broadcast media

Media monitoring is the process of tracking and analysing various forms of media, including print, online, broadcast, and selected social media, to gather mentions and insights on specific topics, companies, individuals, or industries. This process helps organisations stay informed about how they are being perceived, enabling them to respond to news, trends, and public opinion.

It can be conducted in a systematic way by comparing the content presented in the media with external sources, in an attempt of fact-checking, or in a less formal manner by independent groups and media critics who aim to check the quality of the information available on the media, especially related to press freedom and holding media organizations responsible. In general, media monitoring focuses on developing insights, in various fields, on what is actually occurring while finding the balance to not overanalyze certain factors.

== In business ==
In the commercial sphere, media monitoring is usually carried out in-house by using a media monitoring service that provides platform access on a subscription basis, or through the use of a PR or marketing agency.

The services that media monitoring companies provide typically include the systematic recording of radio and television broadcasts, social media, web-TV, the collection of press clippings from print media publications and the collection of data from online information sources. The material collected usually consists of any media output that makes reference to the client, its activities and its designated topics of interests. The monitoring of online consumer sources such as blogs, forums and social networks is more specifically known as buzz monitoring which informs the company of how its service or product is perceived by users.

Media monitoring is performed by tracking the number of times a keyword (often the company, a name or a specific topic) was mentioned within different platforms, including magazines, newspapers, blogs, and social media. These entries are referred to as "clippings" and are often presented in a feed-like view by media monitoring platforms. Additionally, they can be summarised in automated reports provided by the platform or analysed by specialist media analysis or public relations companies.

== In social sciences ==
Media monitoring is often deployed by social scientists to look at how something is presented in different media all over the globe. They often look for common biases in how an event is portrayed in the many different types of media. The use of large-scale monitoring techniques by computer scientists enabled the exploration of different aspects of the media system such as the visualisation of the media-sphere, the sentiment and objectivity analysis of news content.

In 2021, media monitoring proved to be useful in the COVID-19 vaccine rollout, as it allowed social scientists to analyze the sentiment surrounding vaccines among the populace. They collected information from various articles and posts on social media from around the internet related to vaccines, which helped them capture and compile people's various complex opinions on vaccinations. Social media interactivity, such as likes, comments, and retweets, also contributed to the study, as they helped indicate whether or not a post was in agreement with the opinion of the general population.

== Technologies involved ==
Media monitoring is practically achieved by a combination of technologies—including audio and video recording, high speed text scanners and text recognition software—and human readers and analysts. The automation of the process is highly desirable and can be partially achieved by deploying data mining and machine learning techniques. These technologies compile and index data from all types of online media sites, such as Twitter, Instagram, and Reddit, which allows for a user to search for specific data on these sites, such as brands, mentions, and opinions, in a more streamlined, simple way.

== See also ==
- Media monitoring service
- Social media measurement
- Literature review
- Media intelligence
