= Henry Ndifor Abi Enonchong =

Cameroonian barrister

Dr. Henry Ndifor Abi Enonchong (22 March 1934 – 26 June 2008) was a Cameroonian barrister.

He was born in Besongabang, in the Manyu department of the Southwest Province. Enonchong is the direct descendant of Chief Abane, who is said to be the founder of the Besongabang chiefdom.

Enonchong married Nancy J. Hartwell, a Florida native, in what was reported as the first interracial marriage in the State of Maryland after the repeal of the 306 year old anti-miscegenation law in June 1967.

Enonchong founded the Federal Cameroon Bar Association and its successor, the Cameroon Bar Association. He also wrote books and articles on Law, including The Cameroon Constitutional Law: Federalism in a Mixed Common Law and Civil Law System, published 1967 in Yaounde and The Cameroon Federal Capital, published in 1972 by Toronto University Press.

In 1974 he founded Enonchong Memorial College, Besongabang, a secondary commercial college, aimed at the education of underprivileged children.

He is also responsible for initiating the Tonkorong-Manyu Upland Integrated Rice Project in Manyu Division, known as the "rice scheme".

In 1997, he was unanimously elected President of the Mamfe Central Chiefs Conference.

He died of cardiac arrest.
