= Meltwater Entrepreneurial School of Technology =

School in Accra, Ghana

- MEST logo
- Founder: Jørn Lyseggen
- Established: 2008
- Mission: Create jobs in Africa
- Budget: $2 million/year
- Owner: Meltwater Foundation
- Location: Accra, Ghana
- Website: meltwater.org

The Meltwater Entrepreneurial School of Technology (MEST) is a pan-Africa technology entrepreneur training program, seed fund, and incubator headquartered in Accra, Ghana. The three-phased institution was founded in 2008 to provide training, investment, and mentoring for aspiring technology entrepreneurs, with the goal of building software companies that generate local jobs and economic growth across Africa.

Since its inception, over 80 African technology companies have been launched through MEST Africa, including MeQasa, Kudobuzz, Asoriba, Complete Farmer, TroTro Tractor, BezoMoney

MEST-backed startups have been acquired by international investors and selected for global accelerators including Techstars, 500 Startups, and Y Combinator, as well as international tech showcases such as the LAUNCH Conference in San Francisco.

== History ==
MEST was unveiled in 2007 when Meltwater founder Jorn Lyseggen announced plans to establish an entrepreneurial training program in Africa. The school opened in February 2008 with the first class of Entrepreneurs in Training (EITs). The first class of EITs graduated in February 2010. The MEST Incubator was also launched with seed funding for portfolio companies from the first batch of EITs.

In 2015, MEST cut down the duration of its main Training Program from 2-years to one year, reducing classroom time in favor of practical exposure and enabling trainees to start building their businesses sooner.

In January 2015, MEST partnered with Vodafone Ghana to sponsor a 48-hour hackathon to help develop access to information, simplify transactions and shorten business processes. MEST announced a partnership with Samsung in April 2015. As part of the agreement, Samsung provided subsidized devices and internship positions, as well as marketing services and mobile application distribution, in exchange for the opportunity to invest in MEST companies through its Samsung Enterprise Business Partners. MEST hosted the first Africa Technology Summit in November 2015 in Accra, Ghana, with the event featuring panels and keynote presentations from a variety of global and African businesses.

In 2016, MEST began recruiting EITs from the French-speaking Ivory Coast and opened an additional business incubator in Lagos while planning to open an additional location in Cape Town. That same year, MEST entered a partnership with Kosmos Energy to form the Kosmos Innovation Centre to focus on creating agriculture solutions. In December 2016, MEST hosted the second Africa Tech Summit in Lagos, Nigeria, including speakers from Google, Uber, Interswitch, Vodacom and Samsung.

In 2017, MEST Africa partnered with 500 Startups for the premier edition of Geeks on a Plane Africa tour which took place in Nigeria (Lagos), Ghana (Accra), and South Africa (Johannesburg and Cape Town). In September 2017, MEST announced that it would expand its presence across the continent with several new incubator spaces in additional African markets.

To celebrate its 10th anniversary in 2018, MEST announced it will be investing an amount of $700,000 in seed funding in 7 portfolio companies.

In 2019, MEST announced Ashwin Ravichandran as its new Managing director

In August 2019, MEST invested $1.1 million in seed capital across 11 tech startups selected from its annual cohort, expanding incubator activities in Nigeria, Kenya, South Africa, and Ghana.

To expand software literacy across West Africa, MEST partnered with the Mastercard Foundation to launch the "Pre-MEST" program, delivering foundational digital skills and entrepreneurship training for early-stage founders in Ghana.

== Organisation and People ==
MEST Africa is the non-profit arm of Meltwater, a Norwegian software as a service (SaaS) solution and the leading online media monitoring company headquartered in San Francisco, California. The founder of Meltwater, Jorn Lyseggen, founded MEST Africa through the Meltwater Foundation, the non-profit arm of the company.

== Program and Initiatives ==
=== Core Training Program ===
MEST sponsors aspiring African entrepreneurs to complete a 12-month program focused on software development, business fundamentals, and entrepreneurship. Graduates, business executives and entrepreneurs from Ghana, Nigeria, Kenya, South Africa and other African countries, are selected each year to receive comprehensive training in computer programming, product management, finance, marketing, sales, business leadership, and other skills required to build a successful technology business on the continent. Upon completing the training program, the best business ideas are provided seed funding and incubated as MEST portfolio companies.

=== Partner Programs ===
Besides, its core training 12-month program, MEST Africa has also announced the rollout of specialized training programs for specific demographics and businesses in partnership with organizations such as Mastercard Foundation, GIZ, UNICEF, Catalyst Fund.

=== Pre-MEST Start-Up Creation Program ===
The Pre-MEST Program is an early-stage training program by MEST in partnership with Mastercard Foundation. The program targets young people with the desire to build their technology and business acumen. By learning the new technical skills needed to start a successful company or add value to existing employers. Pre-MEST works to further improve and add value to the growing demand and interest in software entrepreneurship across Ghana.

=== Pan-African Tech Initiatives ===
In 2018, MEST Africa launched its inaugural Pan-African Pitch competition, the MEST Africa Challenge, which saw over 700 applications from startups in Ghana, Nigeria, Kenya, and South Africa. Since then, MEST has organized the competition each year offering up to $50,000 in equity investment to African entrepreneurs as they build and scale businesses on the continent.

Leveraging on its network, MEST has been organizing the MEST Africa Summit, formerly Africa Technology Summit - an Africa-wide technology summit - since 2015. The event which has been organized in different African cities Accra, Lagos, Cape Town and Nairobi over the years, brings together the continent's entrepreneurs, investors, ecosystem players, and executives from across Africa and globally to discuss learnings, trends, challenges, and innovations on the continent.

== Recognitions ==
In February 2015, the school was recognized as one of the top 10 most innovative companies of Africa by Fast Company. Inc.com also named MEST Africa as one of 5 companies pioneering tech in developing countries. In 2015, Aljazeera recognized MEST Africa as a successful incubator for African startups.

Syncommerce, a MEST Portfolio company won Best Game and Entertainment startup at Techcrunch's 2017 Startup Battlefield Africa. In 2020, MEST alumna and BACE API co-founder Charlette N'Guessan became the first female entrepreneur to win the Royal Academy of Engineering's Africa Prize for Engineering Innovation for her facial recognition cybersecurity software. Her innovation was said to have the potential to ‘revolutionize cybersecurity and help curb identity fraud on the continent’.

The Royal Academy of Engineering also announced MEST portfolio companies CodeLn and Jumeni as finalists of the Africa Prize for engineering innovation award in 2021

== Portfolio ==
MEST provides seed funding of $10k-$100k and incubation to early-stage companies coming out of its training program. Over 80 early-stage software companies across industries have received funding upon completion of the training program.

=== List of Portfolio Companies ===
  - Adi+Bolga
  - AgroInnova
  - Aidahbot
  - Ampersand
  - Anitrack
  - Asoriba
  - BACE
  - Beam
  - Beam
  - BezoMoney
  - Bidiibuild
  - Boxconn
  - Buildpals
  - CodeLn
  - CoFundie
  - CompleteFarmer
  - Covibes
  - Curacel Health
  - DaMansah
  - DevLess
  - Dropque
  - Eleka
  - Farmula
  - FreelancePro
  - Ghalani
  - Heny
  - Joluud
  - Joovlin
  - Judy
  - Jumeni
  - KPI Lens
  - Kudobuzz
  - Kweza
  - Leti Arts
  - Loystar
  - Massira
  - MeQasa
  - mPawa
  - mPawa
  - Nadia
  - Nandimobile
  - Nestmetric
  - Niqao
  - Noni
  - Nvoicia
  - Once Out
  - Orgaroo
  - Orgaroo
  - Pollafrique
  - Qisimah
  - QualiTrace
  - Saada
  - Shina
  - Shopa
  - Suba
  - SynCommerce
  - Tendo
  - TransGov
  - Tress
  - Trotro Tractor
  - Truckr
  - VendyAds
  - VesiCash
  - Vestracker
  - Vestracker
  - Zuri

=== Exists ===
  - AdGeek
  - Adsbrook
  - AFRadio
  - Amplify
  - Claim Sync
  - Dropifi
  - PaySail
  - Retail Tower
  - Saya

== See also ==
- Education in Ghana
- List of business incubators
- List of schools in Ghana
