= Media monitoring service =

Service to provide media content of interest to clients

A media monitoring service, press clipping service, clipping service, or clipping bureau, as known in earlier times, provides clients with copies of media content of interest to them and subject to changing demand. What they provide may include documentation, content, analysis, or editorial opinion, general or specific.

These services tend to specialize their coverage by subject, industry, size, geography, publication, journalist, or editor. The printed sources, which could be readily monitored, greatly expanded with the advent of telegraphy and submarine cables in the mid- to late-19th century; the various types of media now available proliferated in the 20th century, with the development of radio, television, the photocopier and the World Wide Web. Though media monitoring is generally used for capturing content or editorial opinion, it also may be used to capture advertising content.

Media monitoring services have been variously termed over time, as new players entered the market, new forms of media were created, and as new uses from available content developed. Alternative terms for these monitoring services include information logistics, media intelligence, and media information services.

== History ==
Since mass media traditionally was limited solely to print media, naturally the monitoring was also limited to these media. The first press clipping agency in London was established in 1881 by Henry Romeike, partnering with newsdealer Curtice. An agency named "L'Argus de la presse" was established in Paris in 1879 by Alfred Cherie, who offered a press-clipping service to Parisian actors, enabling them to buy reviews of their work rather than purchasing the whole newspaper.

The National Press Intelligence Company began in New York in 1885. More than a dozen clipping services were in operation by 1899. The services opening up across the United States formed a cooperative network to increase their range. By 1932, the Romeike company and Luce's Press Clipping Bureau shared 80% of the clipping business in the United States.

Initially, press clipping services primarily served "vanity" purposes: actors, tycoons, and socialites eager to read what newspapers had written about them. By the 1930s, the bulk of the clipping subscriptions were for big business. Government agencies have been subscribers, as have other newspapers.

Early clipping services employed women to scan periodicals for mentions of specific names or terms. The marked periodicals were then cut out by men and pasted to dated slips. Women would then sort those slips and clippings to be sent to the services' clients.

As radio and later television broadcasting were introduced in the 20th century, press clipping agencies began to expand their services into the monitoring of these broadcast media, and this task was greatly facilitated by the development of commercial audio and video tape recording systems in the 1950s and 1960s.

With the growth of the Internet in the 1990s, media monitoring service extended their services to the monitoring of online information sources using new digital search and scan technologies to provide output of interest to their clients. For example, Universal Press Clipping Bureau, which began in 1908 in Omaha, Nebraska, changed its name in the 1990s to Universal Information Services as it expanded into digital technology. In 1998, the now-defunct WebClipping website began monitoring Internet-based news media. By 2012, Gartner estimated that there were more than 250 social media monitoring vendors.

== Evolution ==
From a cut-and-clip service, media clipping today has expanded to incorporate technology with information. The idea behind clipping services, that information could be isolated from its original publication, influenced the interfaces of digital news sources such as LexisNexis, enabling users to search by keywords. Online tools such as Google Alerts notify services and individual users of results for specific terms and names.

Service delivery happens at three fronts. Clients may get their original hard copy clips through traditional means (mail/overnight delivery) or may opt for digital delivery. Digital delivery allows the end user to receive via email all the relevant news of the company, competition and industry daily, with updates as they break. The same news may also be indexed (as allowed by copyright laws) in a searchable database to be accessed by subscribers. Another option of this service is auto-analysis, wherein the data can be viewed and compared in different formats.

Every organization that uses PR invariably uses news monitoring as well. In addition to tracking their own publicity, self-generated or otherwise, news monitoring clients also use the service to track competition or industry specific trends or legislation, to build a contact base of reporters, experts, leaders for future reference, to audit the effectiveness of their PR campaigns, to verify that PR, marketing and sales messages are in sync, and to measure impact on their target market. City, State, and Federal agencies use news monitoring services to stay informed in regions they otherwise would not be able to monitor themselves and to verify that the public information disseminated is accurate, accessible in multiple formats and available to the public. Some monitoring services specialize in one or more areas of press clipping, TV and radio monitoring, or internet tracking. Media analysis is also offered by most news monitoring services.

Television news monitoring companies, especially in the United States, capture and index closed captioning text and search it for client references. Some TV monitoring companies employ human monitors who review and abstract program content; other services rely on automated search programs to search and index stories.

Online media monitoring services utilize automated software called spiders or robots (bots) to automatically monitor the content of free online news sources including newspapers, magazines, trade journals, TV station and news syndication services. Online services generally provide links but may also provide text versions of the articles. Results may or may not be verified for accuracy by the online monitoring service. Most newspapers do not include all of their print content online and some have web content that does not appear in print.

In the United States, there are trade associations formed to share best practices which include the North American Conference of Press Clipping Services and the International Association of Broadcast Monitors.

== Law cases ==
Two parallel cases developed in 2012, one in the United States, and one in the United Kingdom. In each case, the legality of temporary copies and the online media monitoring service offered to clients, was in dispute. Essentially the two cases covered the same issue (media clippings shown to clients online) and with the same defendant, Meltwater Group. The plaintiff differed, being a UK copyright collection society (UK) rather than Associated Press (US), but upon parallel grounds.

The activity was ruled unlawful in the US (under the "fair use" doctrine). In the UK under UK and EU copyright law, service providers need a licence. Users are also licensed. If users only viewed the original source without getting a headline or snippet or printing the article this is not an infringement, and temporary copies to enable a lawful purpose are themselves lawful, but in practice services for business do not work this way.

== See also ==
- Media intelligence
- Content discovery platform
- DHS media monitoring services
- Mediaboard
