= Meltwater (company) =

Software company

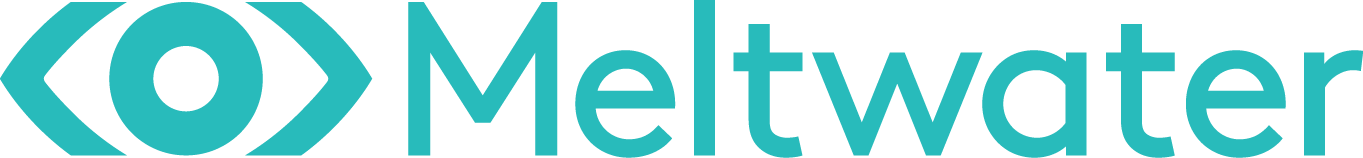
- Formerly: Meltwater Group
- Type: Private company
- Founded: 2001; 25 years ago in Oslo, Norway
- Founder: Jørn Lyseggen; Gard Haugen
- Headquarters: San Francisco, California, United States
- Area served: Worldwide
- Key people: Jørn Lyseggen (Chairman); John Box (CEO)
- Revenue: ▲US$439 million (2023)
- Number of employees: 2,200 (2022)

Meltwater is an online media, social and consumer intelligence company. The company was founded in Oslo, Norway, by Jørn Lyseggen, in 2001 and is headquartered in San Francisco, California, with additional offices across Europe, North America, Asia/Pacific, Australia, and Africa. The company employs around 2,200 people and has approximately 27,000 clients internationally. In February 2023, Meltwater reported US$439 million in revenue for the full 2022 fiscal year.

The Meltwater Foundation, the non-profit arm of the company, started Meltwater Entrepreneurial School of Technology (MEST) in Accra, Ghana. MEST is a Pan-African training program, seed fund and incubator, founded by Jorn Lyseggen in 2008, to provide training, investment, and mentoring for aspiring technology entrepreneurs in Africa.

== History ==
The company was founded in 2001 as Magenta News by Jørn Lyseggen and Gard Haugen. The company's first product was a news clipping service that scanned 100,000 news sources to collect keywords of relevance to its business customers. The pair bootstrapped the company with US$15,000. In 2005, the company relocated its headquarters to San Francisco and changed its name to Meltwater News. In 2008, through the company's nonprofit arm, the Meltwater Foundation, Lyseggen launched the Meltwater Entrepreneurial School of Technology in Accra, Ghana to provide entrepreneurial, software and business training to its Entrepreneurs in Training (EITs).

In 2010, the company announced the release of Meltwater Press, a web-based media contact database that uses natural language processing technology to connect journalists with their most relevant covered topics. After the acquisitions of the Bangalore-based social media monitoring company BuzzGain in 2010, and the CRM software developer JitterJam in February 2011, Meltwater released the social marketing and business intelligence tool Buzz Engage in June 2011. In August 2011, the company acquired the real-time social search engine, IceRocket, and integrated its functionality into its rebranded Buzz Engage platform, Meltwater Buzz.

In 2015, the company launched a new media intelligence platform, called "Meltwater". In March 2016, Meltwater acquired the analytics startup, Encore Alert, and integrated its functionality into its Smart Alert product offering. In early 2017, Meltwater acquired Wrapidity, an Oxford University spin-out, to add AI to media monitoring capabilities automating extraction of data from unstructured web-based content. That same year, the company acquired the Hong Kong–based big data company Klarity, the media monitoring arm of the Postmedia Network, Infomart, the media monitoring company, Encore Alerts, and the data analysis startup, Cosmify. In August 2017, Meltwater acquired Algo in combination of cash and stock. In March 2018, Meltwater acquired DataSift. In April 2018, Meltwater acquired Sysomos. In May 2020, Niklas de Besche took over as CEO from Jørn Lyseggen with Lyseggen continuing in the capacity of chairman of the board.

In November 2020, Meltwater announced John Box as CEO. In December 2020, Meltwater listed on the Euronext Growth Oslo (ticker code: MWTR). In December 2020, Meltwater became the title partner for the Meltwater Champions Chess Tour, an online chess tournament where the best players in the world compete in total of ten tournaments for a total prize pool of US$1.5 million. As part of that partnership, Magnus Carlsen, the four-time World Chess Champion, became a global brand ambassador for Meltwater.

In 2021, Meltwater acquired five companies in the span of eight months. In March 2021, the Company announced an agreement to acquire Linkfluence, a French SaaS company which uses artificial intelligence to algorithmically mine social media for consumer insights. In April 2021, the Company announced an agreement to acquire their long-time partner, Klear, the market leader in the influencer marketing space. On June 18, 2021, Meltwater entered into an agreement to acquire Owler, a Silicon Valley innovator in the $30 billion market for business information, for $18.9 million in cash and $5.6 million in company equity.

== Litigation ==
Meltwater has been involved in legal proceedings surrounding the legality of temporary copies and its online media clipping service. It was ruled unlawful in the United States under the "fair use" doctrine and lawful in the UK (under UK and EU copyright law).

=== In the United States ===
On March 21, 2013, U.S. District Judge Denise Cote of the Southern District of New York rejected Meltwater's claims that its use of Web stories drawn from a scan of 162,000 news websites from more than 190 countries was a fair use of copyright-protected material, in a lawsuit brought by The Associated Press. All claims and counterclaims were dismissed in July 2013.

=== In the UK ===
The case revolved around whether a client lacking a license would infringe copyright by being shown, and viewing, the extracts from copyrighted material in this way (it was common ground that to subsequently view a full article would require a license). and was due to be heard in February 2011.

In mid-March 2010, in an interim jurisdiction question the Copyright Tribunal ruled in favor of Meltwater and the Public Relations Consultants Association (PRCA), with the NLA was ordered to pay the costs of the suit. However, on July 27, 2011, Meltwater lost upon appeal in the UK High Court.

The decision was reversed in 2013 by the UK Supreme Court, which ruled Meltwater's activities legal—subject to certain questions referred to the European Court of Justice intended to clarify matters of a cross-border nature. The rationale was that viewing of copyright works was not, and had never been, illegal in either the UK or European law, and Article 5.1 of the European Directive 2001/29/EC (which covers "temporary copies") permitted automated copying of a temporary nature for a lawful purpose. As mere viewing by Meltwater's clients was lawful under UK and EU law, the technical automated creation of temporary copies to enable and facilitate this were also lawful.
