= Ulmus minor 'Punctata' =

Elm cultivar

- Species: Ulmus minor
- Cultivar: 'Punctata'
- Origin: Europe

The field elm cultivar 'Punctata' ['spotted', the leaf] first appeared in the 1886–87 catalogue of Simon-Louis of Metz, France, as U. campestris punctata. It was distributed by the Späth nursery, Berlin, in the 1890s and early 1900s as U. campestris punctata Sim.-Louis, the Späth catalogue listing it separately from U. campestris fol. argenteo-variegata (which was probably either the Field Elm cultivar 'Argenteo-Variegata' or the English Elm cultivar 'Argenteo-Variegata') and from U. campestris fol. argenteo-marginata. Green considered it possibly a synonym of the Field Elm cultivar 'Argenteo-Variegata'.

'Punctata' is not to be confused with the European White Elm cultivar U. laevis 'Punctata'.

== Description ==
'Punctata' was described by Simon-Louis as having spotted leaves. Späth's catalogue described leaves as "marbled and splashed with white".

== Pests and diseases ==
Most U. minor cultivars are susceptible to Dutch elm disease, but, if not grafted, can survive through root-sucker regrowth.

== Cultivation ==
No specimens are known to survive, unless the tree is synonymous with 'Argenteo-Variegata' or 'Atinia Variegata', both still cultivated. One tree was planted in 1898 as U. campestris punctata at the Dominion Arboretum, Ottawa, Canada. Three specimens supplied by the Späth nursery, Berlin, to the RBGE in 1902 as U. campestris punctata may survive in Edinburgh, as it was the practice of the Garden to distribute trees about the city (viz. the Wentworth Elm); the current list of Living Accessions held in the Garden per se does not list the plant. A specimen of U. campestris punctata, obtained from Späth before 1914 and planted in 1916, stood in the Ryston Hall arboretum, Norfolk, in the early 20th century. An 'Album Punctatum', with "white-speckled foliage", appeared in the 1902 catalogue of the Bobbink and Atkins nursery, Rutherford, New Jersey.

== Synonymy ==
- U. minor 'Argenteo-Variegata' ?
- U. minor 'Atinia Variegata' ?
