= Ulmus 'Argenteo-Marginata' =

Elm cultivar

- Genus: Ulmus
- Cultivar: 'Argenteo-Marginata'
- Origin: Germany

The elm cultivar Ulmus 'Argenteo-Marginata' was first mentioned by Deegen in Deutsches Magazin für Garten- und Blumenkund (1879), as Ulmus campestris elegans foliis argenteo-marginatis. An U. campestris fol. argenteo-marginata Hort. (later just U. campestris argenteo-marginata) was distributed by the Späth nursery, Berlin, from the 1890s to the 1930s.

Green considered the tree possibly a cultivar of field elm or of U. × hollandica.

== Description ==
Deegen described the tree as having leaves bordered with white. The leaves were described in a later reference as also being very rough above, weakly pubescent below, and measuring < 8 cm long by < 4 cm broad. Späth catalogues likewise describe white-bordered leaves.

== Cultivation ==
No specimens are known to survive, unless the tree is synonymous with one of two cultivars with sometimes silver-white margined leaves, U. minor 'Argenteo-Variegata' or the rough-leafed U. minor 'Atinia Variegata', both of which match the microphylla foliis marginatis description (Synonymy below). One tree was planted in 1897 as U. campestris fol. argenteis marginatis at the Dominion Arboretum, Ottawa, Canada. Three specimens supplied by the Späth nursery, Berlin, to the RBGE in 1902 as U. campestris fol. argenteo-marginata may survive in Edinburgh, as it was the practice of the Garden to distribute trees about the city (viz. the Wentworth Elm); the current list of Living Accessions held in the Garden per se does not list the plant.

== Synonymy ==
- Ulmus campestris var. microphylla foliis marginatis: Hartwig & Rümpler, Illustrirtes Gehölzbuch 391, 1892.
- Ulmus campestris var. nuda subvar. foliis marginatis: Wesmael , Bulletin de la Fédération des sociétés d'horticulture de Belgique 1862: 389, 1863.
