= Gussow =

Gussow is a surname. Notable people with the surname include:

- Adam Gussow (born 1958), American musician and writer
- Alan Gussow (1931–1997), American artist and professor
- Hans Theodor Güssow (1879-1961), German/Canadian plant pathologist
- Joan Dye Gussow (1928–2025), American academic and writer
- Karl Gussow (1843–1907), German artist and professor
- Margarete Gussow (born 1896), German astronomer
- Mel Gussow (1933–2005), American theater and movie critic
- Roy Gussow (1918–2011), American artist

== See also ==
- Gus Sow (born 1995), English professional footballer
