= Ulmus minor 'Picturata' =

Field Elm cultivar

- Species: Ulmus minor
- Cultivar: 'Picturata'
- Origin: England

The Field Elm cultivar Ulmus minor 'Picturata' (:decorated with colour) was listed in the 1880 catalogue of Simon-Louis (Metz, France), as Ulmus picturata Cripps, suggesting an English origin in the nursery of Thomas Cripps of Tunbridge Wells, Kent, who marketed elm cultivars in the 1860s. Clibrans' nursery of Altrincham, Cheshire, marketed it in the early 20th century as Ulmus campestris picturata variegata, their Ulmus campestris being English Elm. Elwes and Henry (1913) placed it under English Elm cultivars.

== Description ==
Henry said that the tree did not appear to differ much from variegated English Elm, except in having larger leaves. The Gembrook or Nobelius Nursery near Melbourne, Australia, mentioned its "very pretty, large variegated foliage".

== Cultivation ==
No specimens are known to survive. There was a small specimen at Kew Gardens in the early 20th century. A 'Picturata' was marketed in the early 20th century by the former Gembrook Nursery near Melbourne, Australia. It is not known whether a variegated field elm distinct from variegated English – or from Ulmus minor 'Argenteo-Variegata', Silver Elm – survives there. An Ulmus campestris picturata variegata, "Variegated English Elm", was marketed by the Klehm nursery of Arlington Heights, Illinois, at the same period, listed separately from Ulmus campestris media variegata argenta, "Silver variegated English Elm" (probably Ulmus minor 'Variegata' by the description in the 1916 catalogue; the nursery used Ulmus campestris for all non-American elms).

== Synonymy ==
- Ulmus campestris f. fol. picturatis: Dippel, Illustriertes Handbuch der Laubholzkunde, 2:25, 1892, described as having leaves spotted white.
- Ulmus campestris picturata variegata
