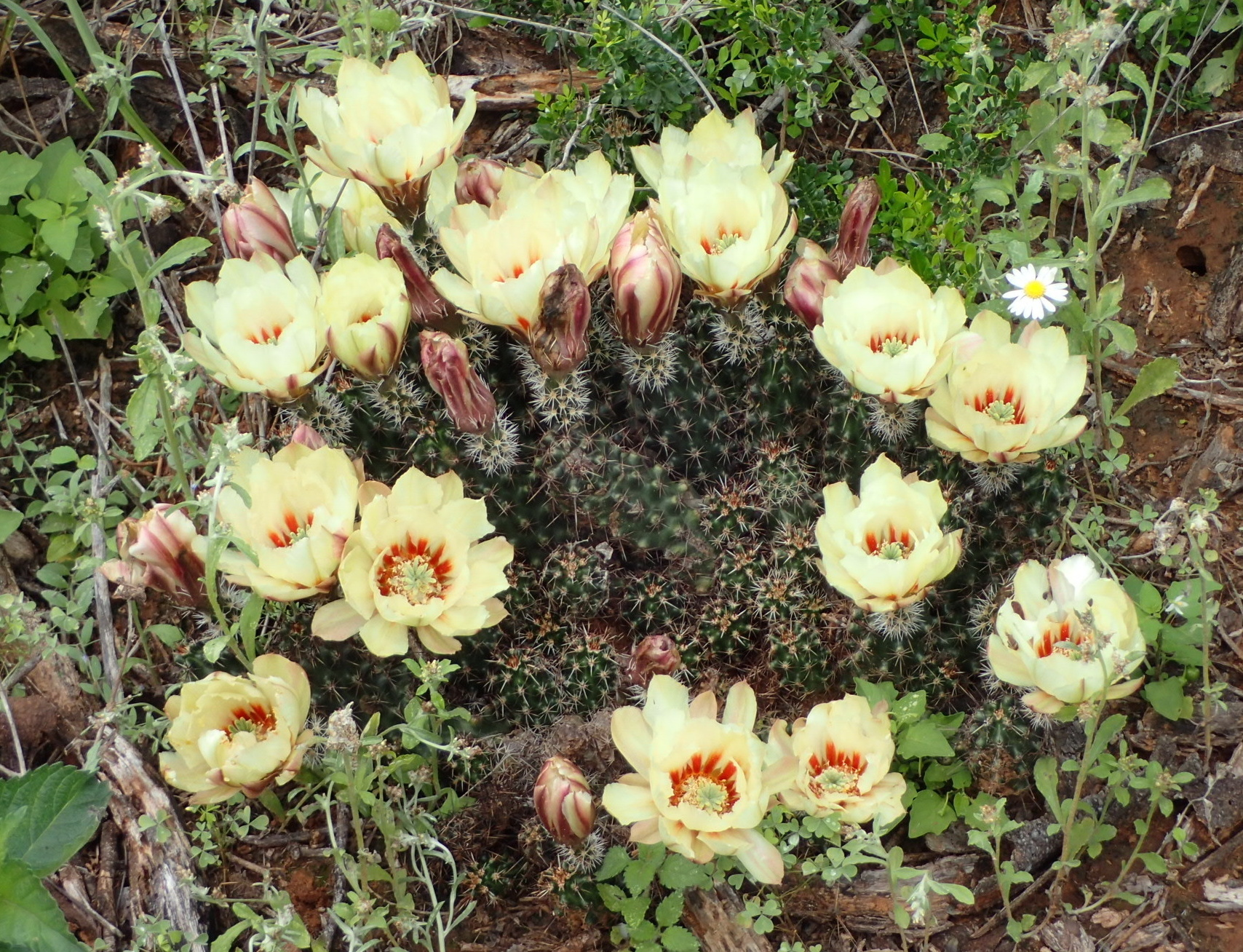

Conservation status
- Least Concern (IUCN 3.1)

Scientific classification
- Kingdom: Plantae
- Clade: Embryophytes
- Clade: Tracheophytes
- Clade: Angiosperms
- Clade: Eudicots
- Order: Caryophyllales
- Family: Cactaceae
- Subfamily: Cactoideae
- Genus: Echinocereus
- Species: E. papillosus

Binomial name
- Echinocereus papillosus Linke ex C.F.Först. & Rümpler, 1886

Synonyms
- Cereus papillosus (Linke ex C.F.Först. & Rümpler) A.Berger 1905; Echinocereus berlandieri var. papillosus (Linke ex C.F.Först. & Rümpler) L.D.Benson 1976; Echinocereus blanckii var. papillosus (Linke ex C.F.Först. & Rümpler) L.D.Benson 1969; Echinocereus angusticeps Clover 1935; Echinocereus berlandieri var. angusticeps (Clover) L.D.Benson 1976; Echinocereus papillosus var. angusticeps (Clover) W.T.Marshall 1941; Echinocereus rungei K.Schum. 1895

= Echinocereus papillosus =

Species of cactus

Echinocereus papillosus is a species of cactus native to Texas and Mexico.

== Description ==
Echinocereus papillosus forms low clusters up to one meter in diameter with numerous shoots. The cylindrical, brownish-green shoots are mostly upright and can reach up to 7 cm (2.8 in) in diameter. They have six to ten clearly tuberculous ribs. Each shoot has a single grayish central spine up to 1.5 cm (0.59 in) long, and seven to eleven stiff, whitish radial spines, each 1 to 1.5 cm (0.39 to 0.59 in) long.

The fragrant, funnel-shaped flowers are bright yellow with an orange-red to purple throat. They appear along the sides of the shoots, measuring 6 to 9 cm (2.4 to 3.5 in) in length and 8 to 12 cm (3.1 to 4.7 in) in diameter. The fruits are spherical.

== Distribution ==
Echinocereus papillosus is found growing in sandy limestone loam in the Northeast Laredo into McMullen County and Alice, Texas and in the Mexican states of Nuevo León, Tamaulipas, and San Luis Potosí around elevations of 400 meters. Plants are found growing along Stenocereus pruinosus, Selenicereus triangularis and Echinocereus enneacanthus var. carnosus .

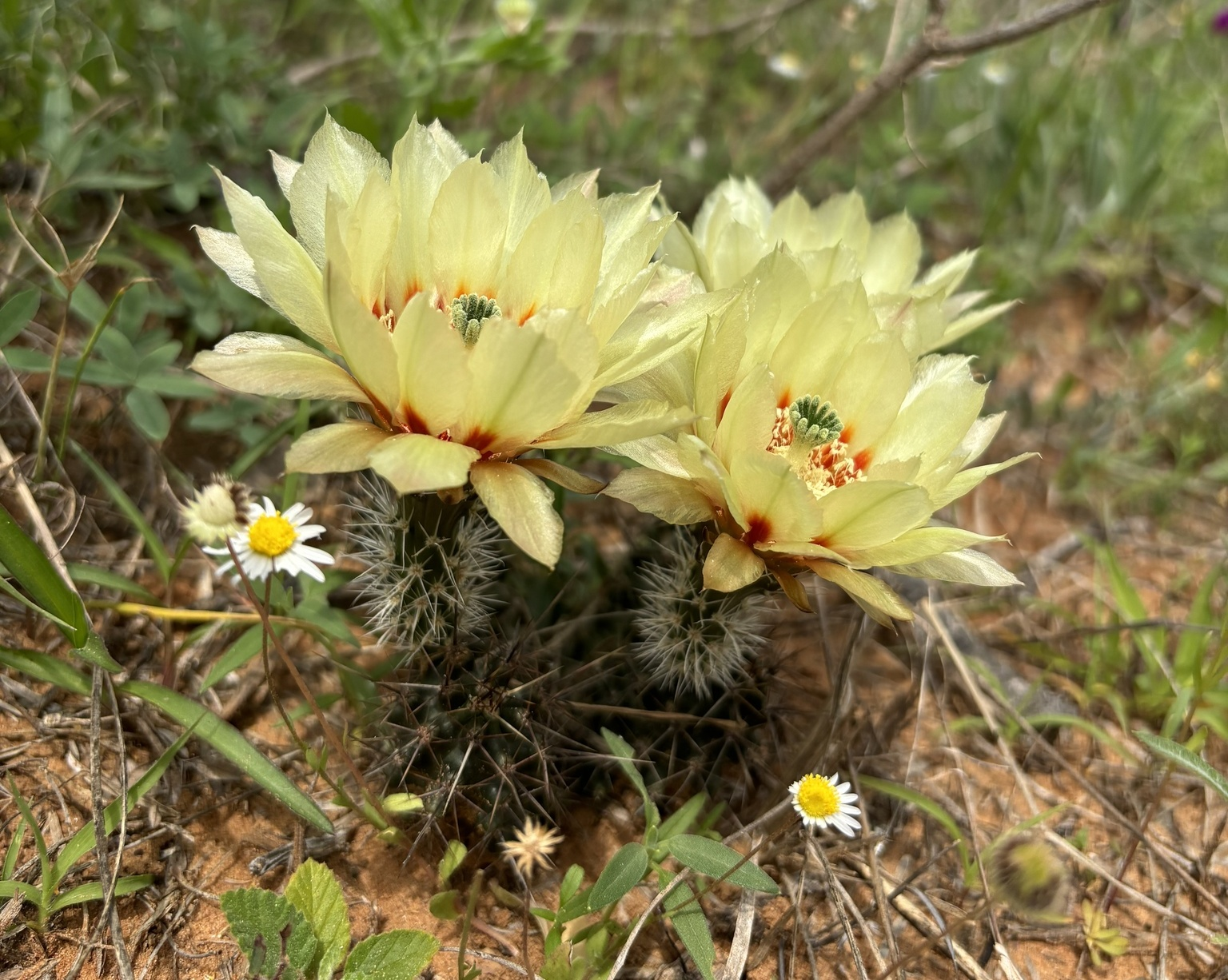

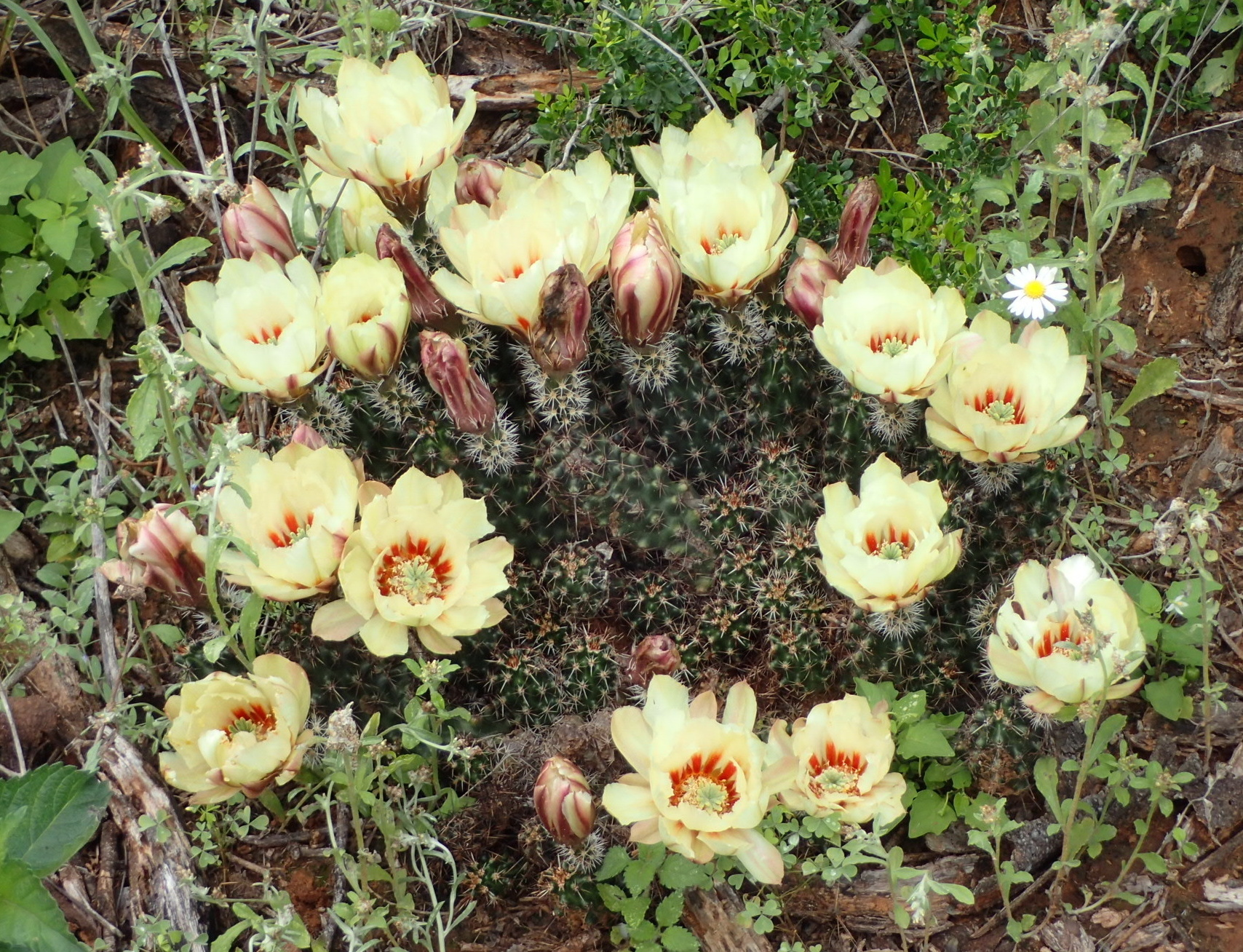
Habitat in San Isidro, Texas

== Taxonomy ==
Karl Theodor Rümpler first described the species in 1885. The specific epithet "papillosus" comes from the Latin word for "papillose," referring to the tuberculous ribs of the species.
