= Isabella Preston =

Canadian horticulturist (1881–1965)

- Born: 4 September 1881; Lancaster, England
- Died: 31 January 1965 (aged 83); Georgetown, Ontario, Canada
- Education: Ontario Agricultural College
- Known for: plant hybridization

Isabella Preston (4 September 1881 – 31 January 1965) was a horticulturist and public servant widely recognized for her achievements in plant hybridization and extensive work in ornamental plant breeding. She is Canada's first female professional plant breeder. During her 26-year career, she produced nearly 200 new hardy hybrids of lily, lilac, crab apple, iris and rose plants for Canada's cold climate. While female plant breeders were rather rare in her day, she quietly challenged gender bias and set the stage for new generations of breeding programs at the Central Experimental Farm in Ottawa, Ontario, Canada and elsewhere.

== Early life and education ==
Isabella Preston was born on 4 September 1881 in Lancaster, England where her father worked as a silversmith. As a child, she attended boarding school in Liverpool and later studied at the University of London. She gardened from an early age, helping her father on the family farm. Her only formal education in horticulture was obtained through a course at Swanley Horticulture College in Kent which she completed before emigrating to Canada in 1912. She was 31 years old when she and her sister Margaret immigrated to Canada following the death of their mother. Margaret had accepted a position as a music teacher in Guelph, Ontario, and encouraged Preston to join her. Preston found her first job in Guelph picking plums, peaches, and raspberries on a fruit farm. She enrolled at the Ontario Agricultural College the same year to study plant breeding and was one of the few women pursuing the subject at the time. Within her first year, Preston transitioned from class-based study to hands-on work under the supervision of under James W. Crow, then head of the Department of Horticulture. In 1913, Crow hired her full-time to supervise the greenhouses and gardens.

== Career ==
Throughout World War I, plant breeders intensified their focus on fruit and vegetable plants. Government campaigns urged increased production in order to feed military personnel. Preston worked on breeding fruit that ripened quickly and was more resistant to insects and disease. From her enrollment at the OAC until 1920, Preston contributed to the successful breeding of various vegetables, fruits and ornamental plants including garden lilies.

She gained international recognition by introducing the acclaimed "George C. Creelman" lily and became the first professional woman hybridist in Canada in 1916. This was accomplished in 1919, when she crossed two lilies, L. regale and L. sargentiae, to produce the Creelman Lily (Lilium × princeps 'George C. Creelman'), a six foot tall white lily. The "George C. Creelman" lily was the first hybrid lily well suited to the Canadian climate. Preston wrote numerous articles on various horticultural subjects, and in 1929 published Garden Lilies, the first book about lily cultivation in Canada. During World War II, Preston acted as an advisor to the Royal Canadian Air Force on plants for camouflaging aircraft hangars. She died on 31 December 1965 in Georgetown, Ontario. Following her death, 139 of her gardening and plant books, along with her personal archives, were donated to the Royal Botanical Gardens Library in Hamilton, Ontario.

In 1920, (at age 40) she relocated to Ottawa, Ontario, Canada and worked as a day labourer for the federal government at the Central Experimental Farm (CEF). Her work was noticed by W.T. Macoun, Dominion Horticulturalist, and she was soon offered the position of Specialist in Ornamental Horticulture. She was the first person to focus solely on breeding ornamental plants. Preston enthusiastically shared her knowledge with amateur and professional gardeners and regularly gave tours of the Central Experimental Farm's ornamental gardens. In 1922, she advised Prime Minister William Lyon Mackenzie King on landscape design at his Kingsmere estate in Gatineau Park.

Over the course off her career Preston produced roughly 200 plant hybrids working with lilies, lilacs, crab apple trees, peonies and roses. She developed many of the 125 different strains in the Central Experimental Farm lilac collection. Her lilac and crab apple hybrids are also still seen flowering on the Central Experimental Farm each spring along with two of her roses. Preston's hybrids were disease-resistant and well suited to geographic regions within Canada since one of the mandates of the CEF was to produce plants hardy enough to survive northern prairie winters. Preston retired from the Central Experimental Farm in 1946 but continued to act as an advisor. In 2018, nearly 100 years after the Creelman Lily was first introduced, it was re-discovered at Royal Botanical Gardens in Hamilton, Ontario from donated bulb stock.

== Horticultural achievements ==
- "George C. Creelman" lily, a large, fragant white flower as the first lily to able to withstand the Canadian Climate It was named after George Creelman, then President of the Agricultural College. The Creelman Lily received the Award of Merit from the Royal Horticultural Society in 1934. Plant enthusiasts took great pleasure in cross-breeding it with other varieties. Because of this cross-breeding, the true Creelman Lily has been lost for decades, though many variations continue to thrive in gardens today.
- The Preston lilacs - 52 varieties that were hardy and late-bloomers, many named after female characters in Shakespeare's plays. Most of these can be seen in the CEF's lilac collection today. (The varieties of lilac that were commonly seen in Europe bloomed too early in the Canadian climate and the buds or blooms were frequently nipped by late spring frosts.) Eighty of Miss Preston's late-blooming cultivars are recorded in the International Lilac Register although only about one-half of these were distributed to other institutions or nurseries. Cultivars 'Audrey', 'Elinor' and 'Isabella' received Awards of Merit from the Royal Horticultural Society, London, England, in 1939, 1951 and 1941, respectively; 'Bellicent' was awarded a First Class Certificate in 1946.
- The Stenographer lilies series – named after the 7 stenographers working at the CEF at the time. These lilies had dark red or orange flowers that faced outward and upward, which was a unique characteristic of this type of plant. Five of the Stenographer series lilies won Awards of Merit from horticulture societies in London and Boston, and were widely distributed commercially.
- Fighter Aircraft lilies – named for second world war Allied planes
- Canadian Lake crab apples (or Rosyblooms) – 15 hardy crab apple trees with coloured leaves and pretty flowers named after Canadian Lakes. Some of these rosyblooms, planted as early as 1928, can still be found in the Arboretum and Ornamental Gardens at the Central Experimental Farm in Ottawa.
- Siberian irises - named after Canadian Rivers
- Preston roses – at least 20 hardy varieties, many of which were named after Canadian native tribes (Agassiz, Algonquin, Antenor, Ardelia, Caribou, Carmenetta, Chippewa, Conestoga, Cree, Erie, Huron, Iroquois, Langford, Micmac, Millicent, Mohawk, Nascapee, Orinda, Patricia Macoun, Ojibway, Poliarchus, Regina, Rosania, Sylvander and Valeria). While her roses never won her awards, they provided an excellent stage for the work of Dr Felicitas Svejda who worked at the CEF from 1956 to 1986 and became known as Canada's rose expert.
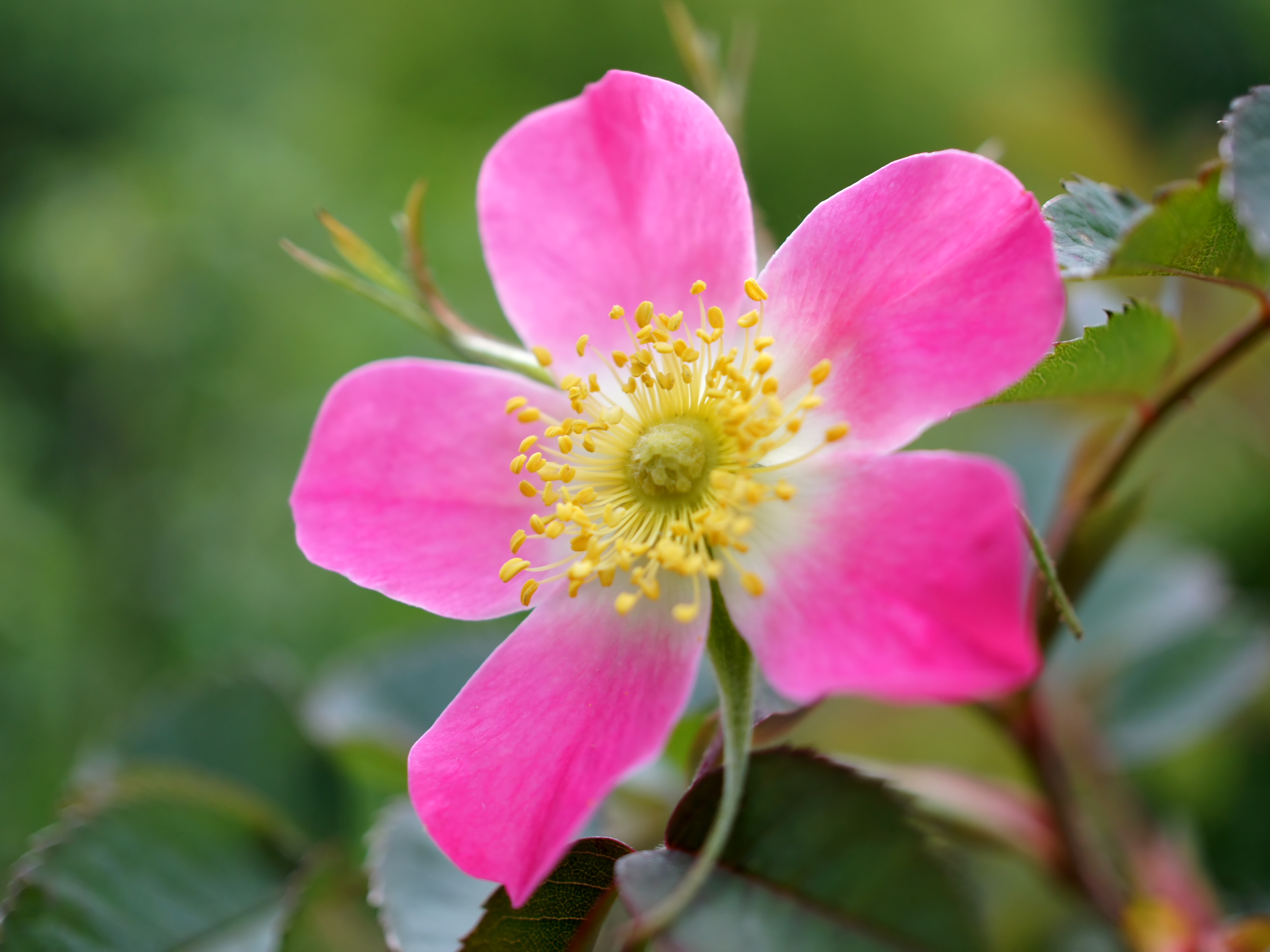
Rosa 'Carmenetta'

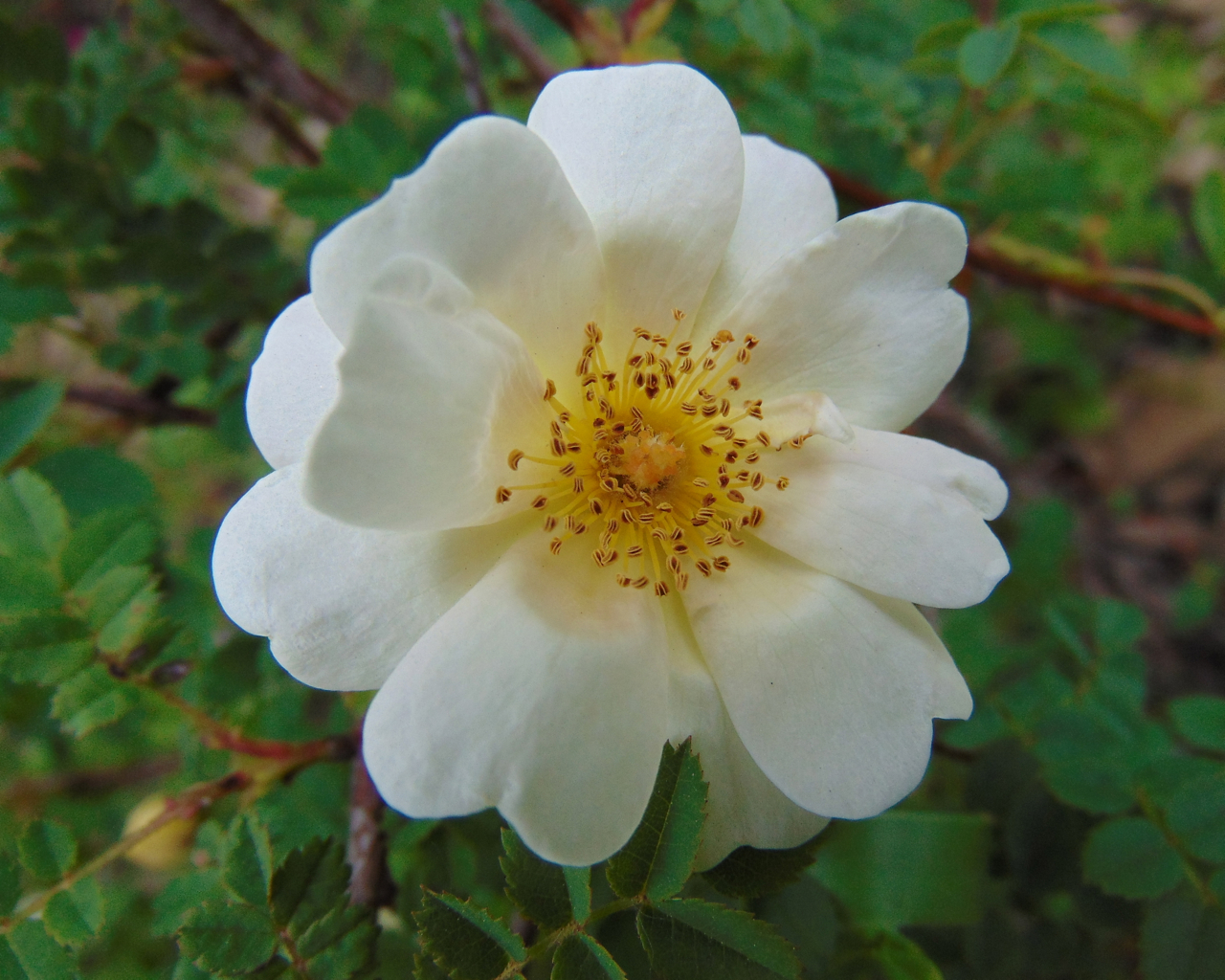
Rosa 'Orinda'

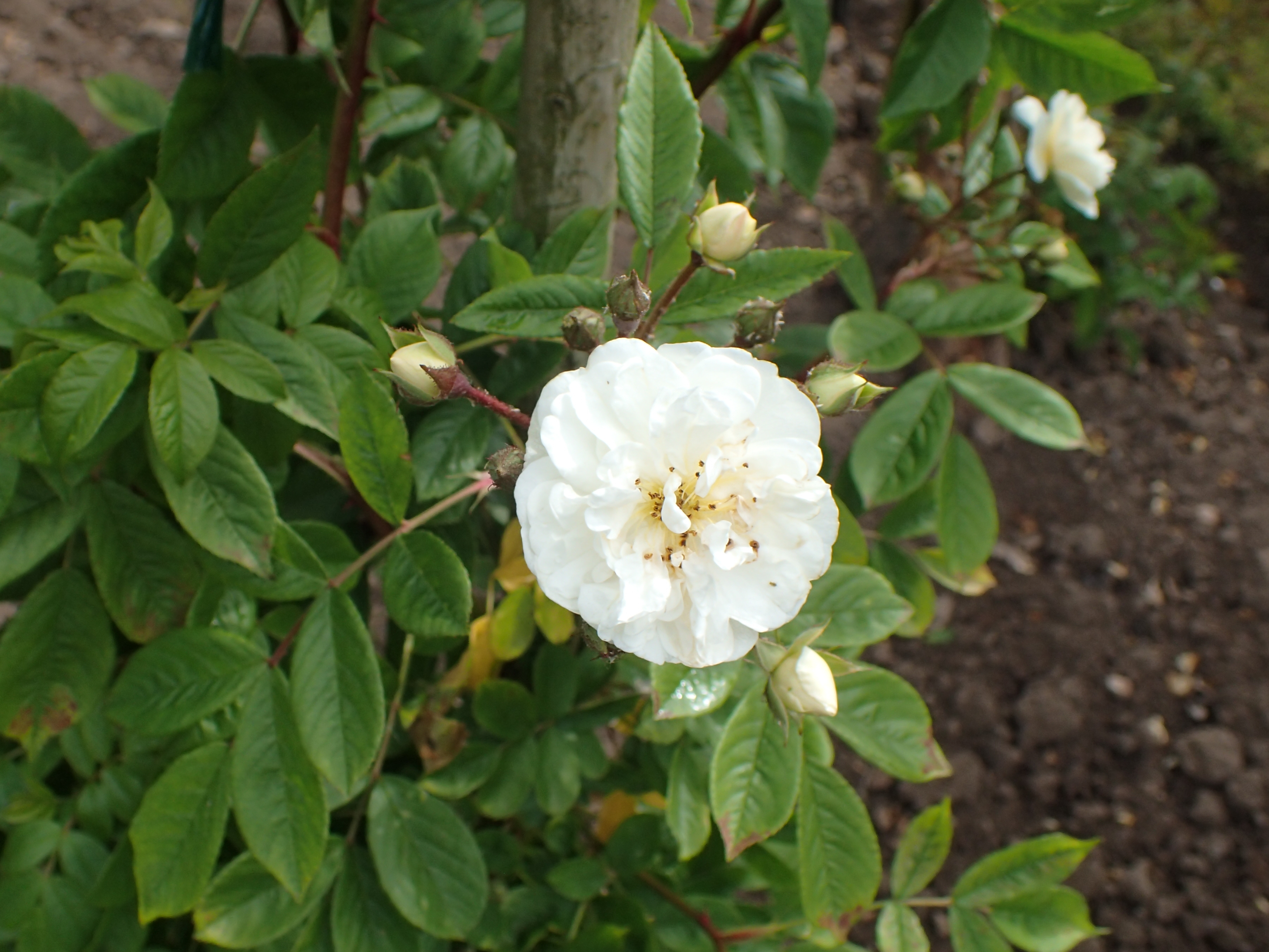
Rosa 'Patricia Macoun'

== Honours and awards ==
Preston was hailed as the "Queen of Ornamental Horticulture" and a new hybrid species of lilacs, "Syringa prestoniae", was named in her honour. This was the result of a cross between wild species from China and put Canada on the lilac "map". In 2005 the Central Experimental Farm in Ottawa created the "Preston Heritage Collection". In February 2007, Canada Post released two new stamps featuring a lilac variety developed by Ms. Preston. She was co-organizer of the North American Lily Society. The Isabella Preston Trophy was established by the North American Lily Society in recognition of her work. She received awards from many Canadian and international horticultural societies including lifetime memberships from the Massachusetts Horticultural Society and the Canadian Iris Society. Notable awards include the Veitch Memorial Medal in Gold (Royal Horticultural Society, London, 1938), Jackson Dawson Medal (Massachusetts Horticultural Society, 1946), Lytell Cup (Lily Committee, Royal Horticultural Society, 1950), and the EH Wilson Memorial Award (North American Lily Society, 1961).

Preston's research is depicted in the poster gallery created by Ingenium Canada's The Women in STEM initiative. This poster gallery is a collaborative effort between the three Ingenium museums: Canada Agriculture and Food, Canada Aviation and Space, and Canada Science and Technology and their partners to support the engagement, advancement and furtherance of women in STEM.

== See also ==
- Timeline of women in science
- Ornamental Gardens, Ottawa
