= Ulmus minor 'Argenteo-Variegata' =

Elm cultivar

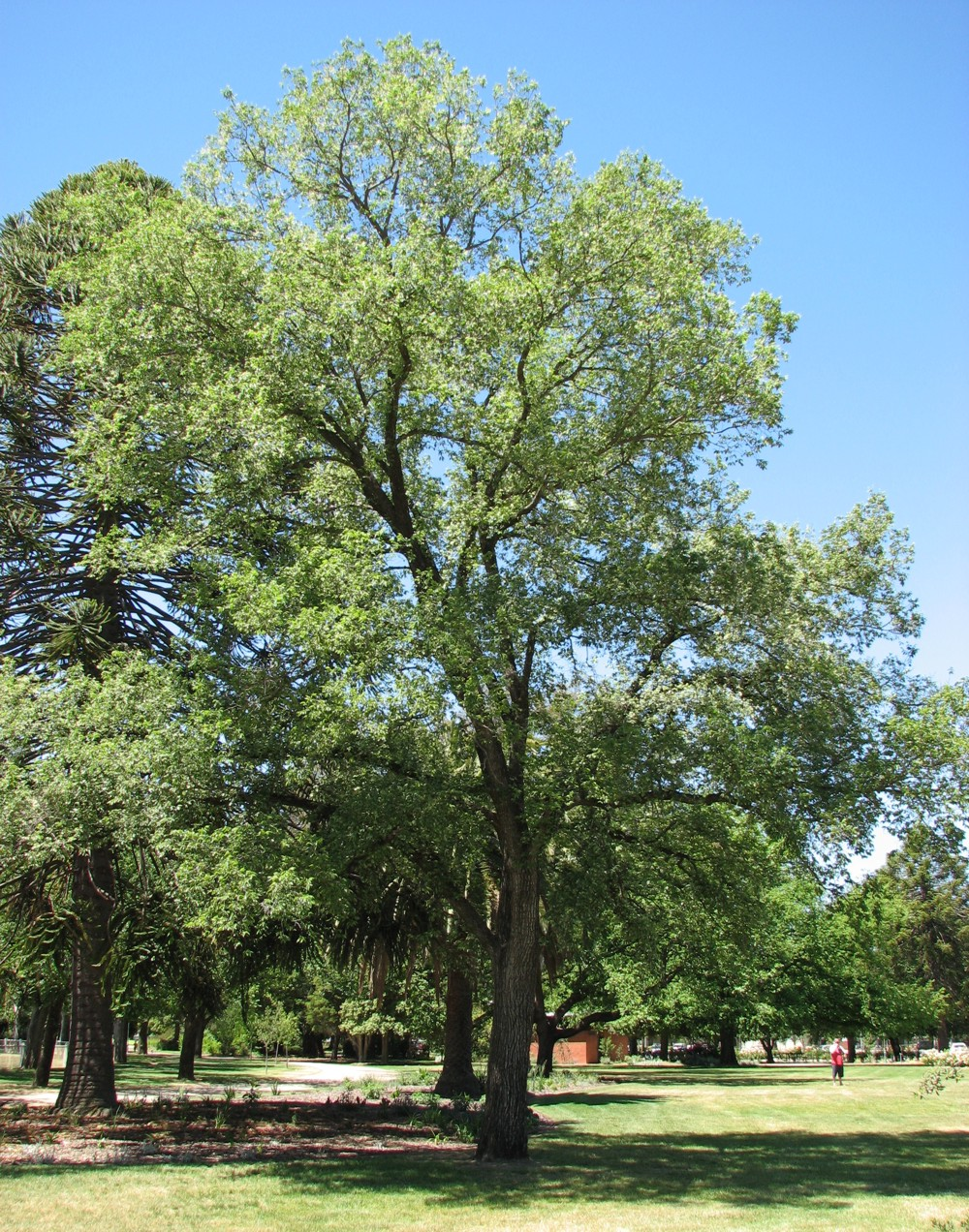
- 'Argenteo-Variegata', Benalla Botanic Garden, Australia
- Species: Ulmus minor
- Cultivar: 'Argenteo-Variegata'
- Origin: Europe

The field elm cultivar Ulmus minor 'Argenteo-Variegata' or simply 'Variegata', known in Australasia and North America as silver elm or tartan elm, is said to have been cultivated in France from 1772. Green noted that variegated forms of field elm "arise frequently, and several clones may have been known under this name". Dumont de Courset (1802) listed an U. campestris var. glabra variegata, Loudon (1838) an U. nitens var. variegata, and Wesmael (1863) an U. campestris var. nuda microphylla variegata.

Silver elm is not to be confused with the much rarer variegated English elm cultivar, U. minor 'Atinia Variegata' (formerly U. procera 'Argenteo-Variegata'), which has the broader, almost orbicular leaves of the type. In the US, nurseries sometimes mislabel Silver elm as U. procera 'Argenteo-Variegata'.

== Description ==
The tree's foliage is randomly blotched and speckled with creamy white, the colour of the leaves on the same tree ranging from almost completely cream to totally green. In 1915 the horticulturalist E. A. Bowles described "a tall Silver Elm" at Myddelton House, his lifelong home at Bulls Cross in Enfield, Middlesex:

"In some seasons it is an absolutely silver pillar from top to toe, with more than half of every leaf pure milky white. Another year it will hardly show the variegation, and in yet another it may be spangled with minute silver specks all over the leaves, but with no large pure white markings. It turns to fine gold in some Novembers. I believe that it is in the seasons that it is greenest that it turns the finest autumn yellow. Mr. Elwes tells me that it is a very fine specimen of a variegated elm, and should have been figured for his great book (Note: Elwes, H. J. & Henry, A. (1913). The Trees of Great Britain & Ireland. Vol. VII. p.1895) if he had seen it in time, and also that it is unusual in being on its own roots, whereas most of them are grafted. This one suckers up all over the lawn and in the adjacent flower beds, and reproduces all its vagaries of variegation in its offspring."

Bowles' photograph and the name "Silver Elm" suggest that the Myddleton House tree was U. minor 'Variegata', rather than Variegated English Elm.

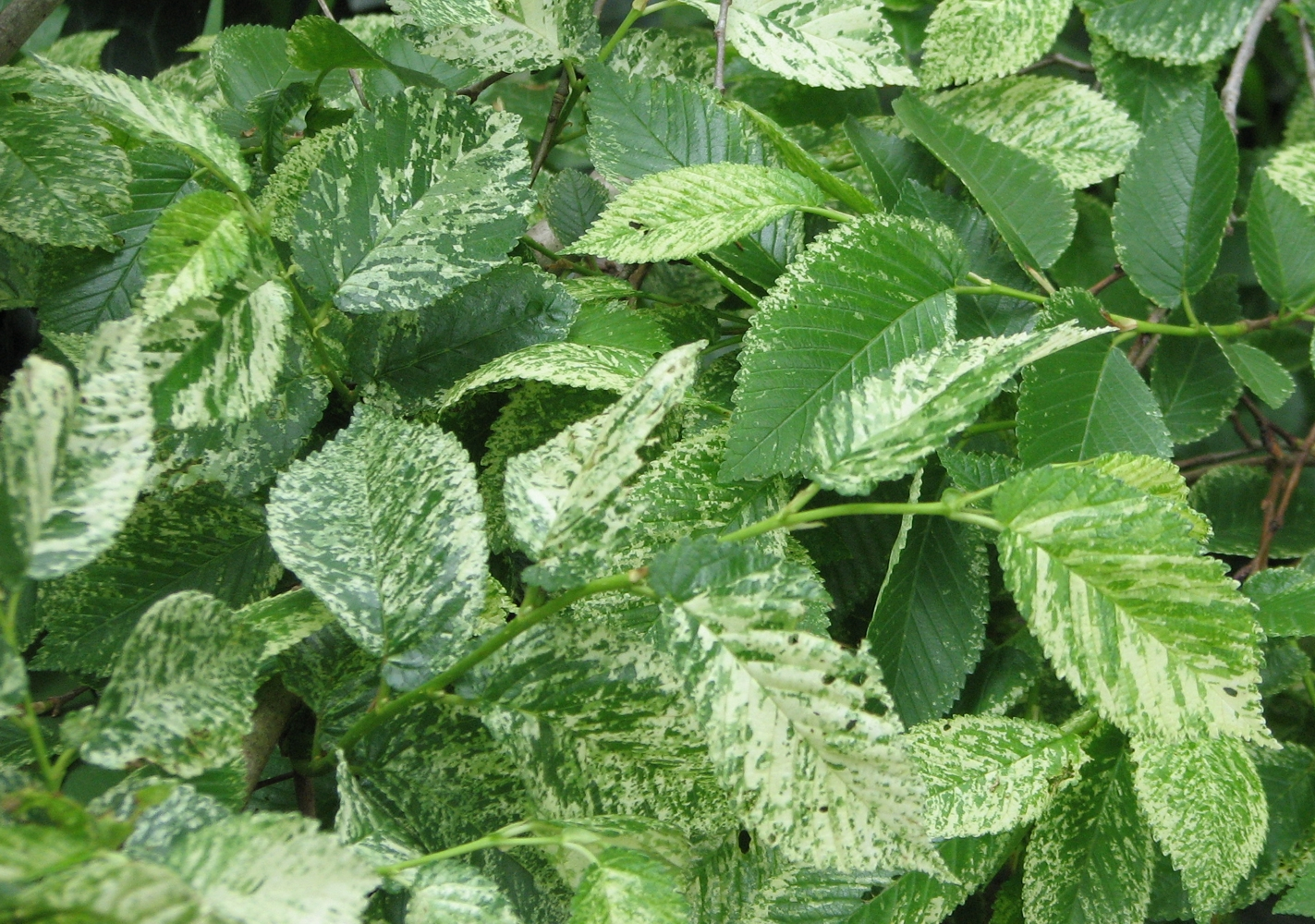
U. minor 'Variegata' foliage

== Etymology ==
As the blotching and margination of the foliage may appear more silver than cream, the cultivar is sometimes listed as U. minor 'Argenteo-Variegata'.

== Pests and diseases ==
The cultivar is as susceptible to Dutch elm disease as the species.

== Cultivation ==
Henry cited Loudon's report that 'Variegata' was cultivated in Chiswick in the early 19th century. The Späth nursery of Berlin supplied the Dominion Arboretum, Ottawa, Canada, with an U. campestris variegata argentea (1893) and an U. campestris fol. argenteis variegatis (1899), which may have been Silver Elm or Tartan Elm, as well as an U. campestris fol. argenteis marginatis (1897), possibly variegated English Elm. An U. fol. argent. var. minor, a "small, silver, variegated variety", appeared in the 1902 catalogue of the Bobbink and Atkins nursery, Rutherford, New Jersey. An Ulmus medio argentea variegata, "a pretty silver-variegated variety", probably Silver Elm, appeared in early 20th-century nursery catalogues in Australia. Silver Elm remains in commercial cultivation in Europe. It was planted (2019) in Dekkerplantsoen, Frans Halslaan, Loosdrecht, as part of Wijdemeren City Council's elm collection. It is commonly cultivated in Australasia and North America, where a number of mature specimens survive (see under Accessions).

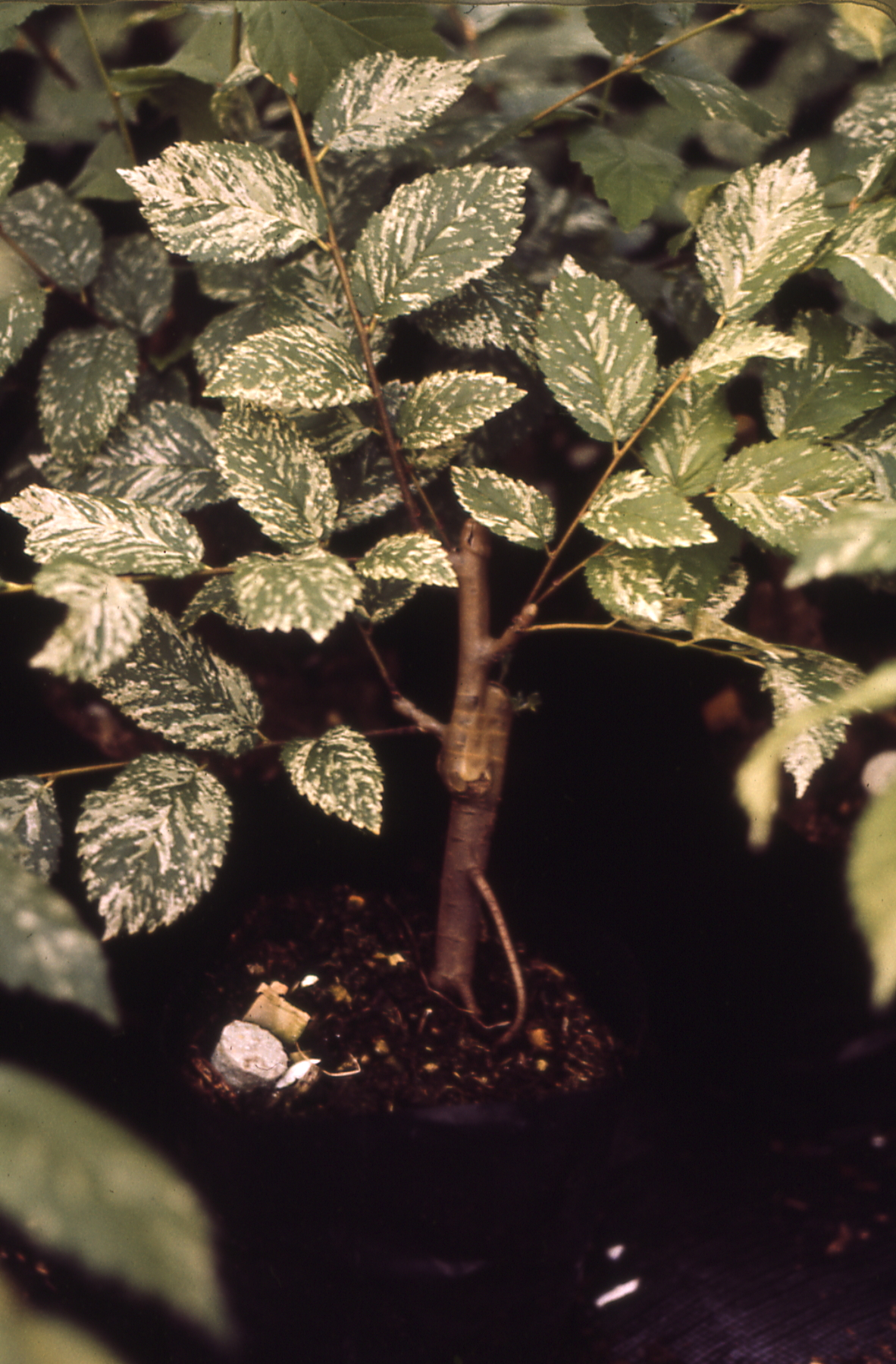
U. minor 'Variegata' grafted on to Ulmus glabra rootstock (photo Mihailo Grbić)

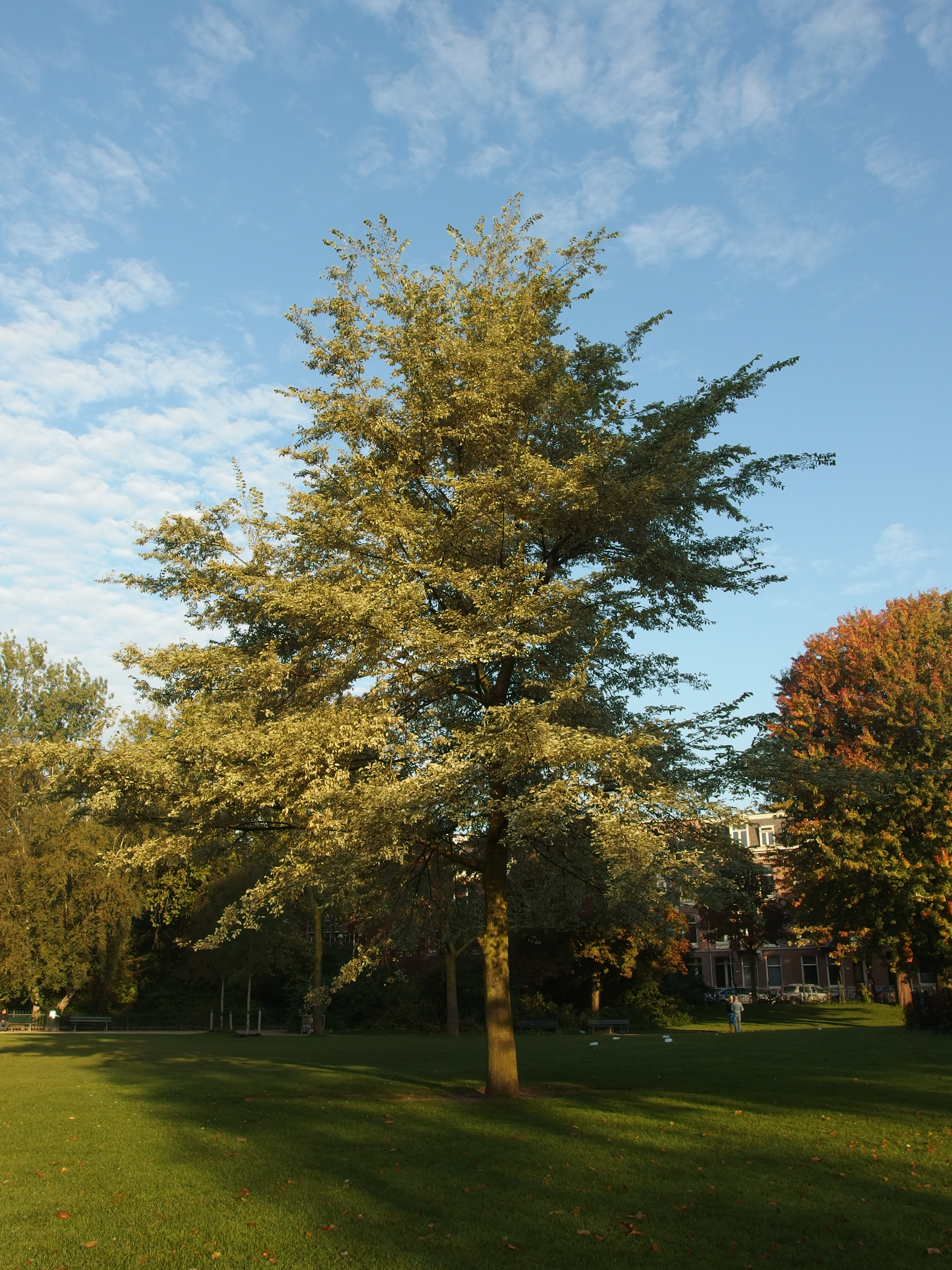
U. minor 'Variegata' in Sarphatipark, Amsterdam (2015)

== Notable trees ==
In the Netherlands, a 25m tall specimen known as the Rococo Iep (:Elm), planted in 1916, grows at Houten, next to the old church. A group of 5 grows along a canal in Alkmaar, on the Kwerenbolwerk, just after the bridge. In Australia, several trees planted in 1897 stand in Geelong Botanic Gardens, Victoria. 'Atinia Variegata' is also found among the elms lining the Avenue of Honour at Ballarat, while approximately 50 trees grow at The Nook, Sunbury, Victoria. There are two mature trees in the Royal Tasmanian Botanical Gardens, Hobart. In the United States, a specimen in Portland, Oregon, has been designated a 'Heritage Tree'.

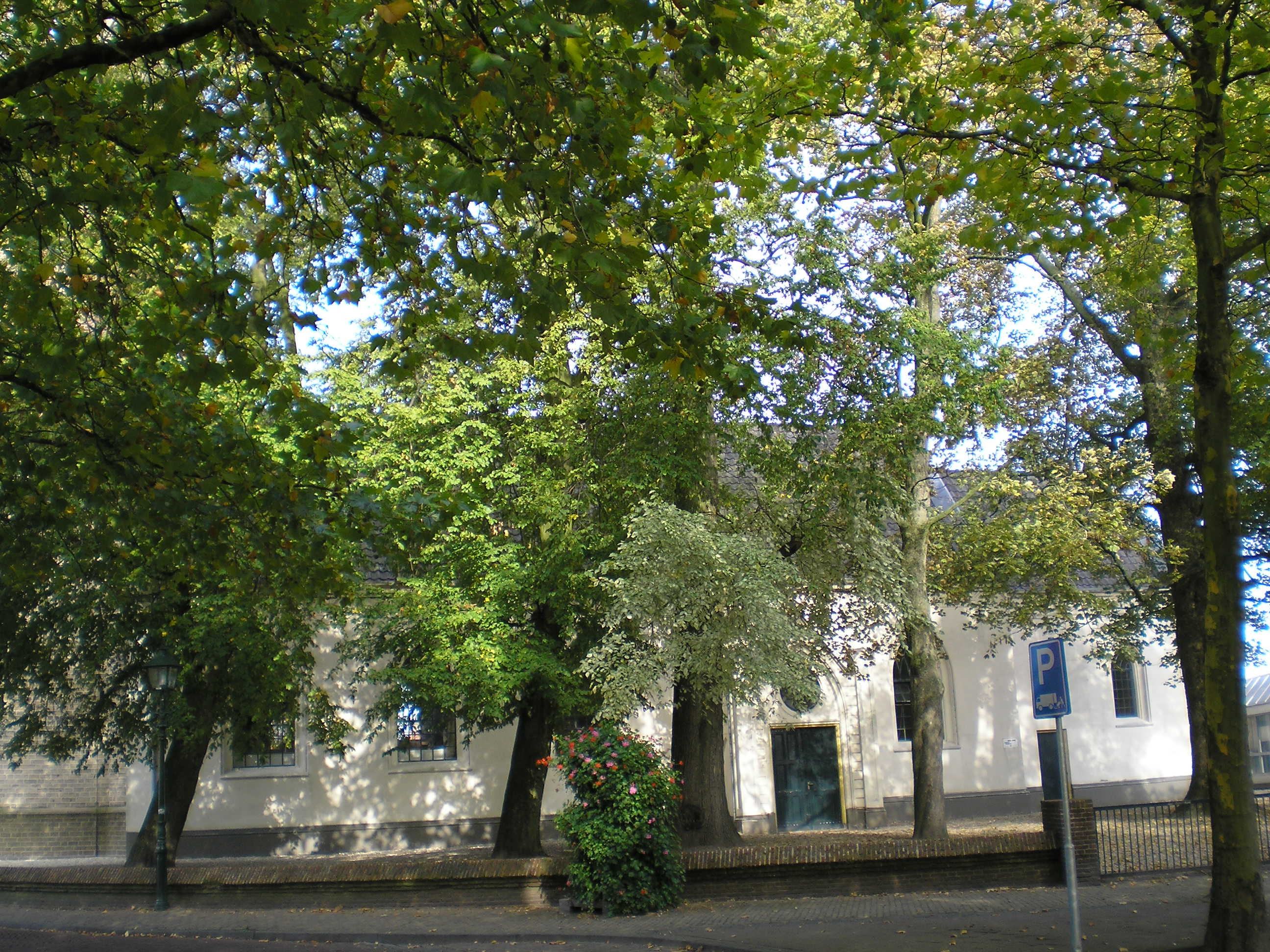
110 year-old 'Variegata' in background, to left of door, by the old church at Houten (2020)

== Synonymy ==
- Ulmus folio glabro, eleganter variegato: Miller, The Gardeners Dictionary ed. 2. 1735, Ulmus no. 7.
- ?Ulmus campestris foliis argenteis: Baudriller, (Angers, France), Catalogue 43, p. 116, 1880.
- Ulmus campestris foliis variegatis: Loddiges, (Hackney, London), Catalogue 1820, p. 35, and by Loudon in Arboretum et Fruticetum Britannicum, 3: 1395, 1838.
- Ulmus campestris punctata: Simon-Louis Nurseries, (Metz, France), Catalogue, 1886–87, p. 60.
- Ulmus campestris var. suberosa variegata Hort.: Hartwig & Rümpler, Illustrirtes Gehölzbuch 581, 1875.

== Accessions ==
=== North America ===
- Morton Arboretum, US. Acc. nos. 450-48, 588-54

=== Europe ===
- Dubrava Arboretum, Lithuania. As U. carpinifolia 'Variegata'. No details available.
- Grange Farm Arboretum , Sutton St. James, Spalding, Lincs., UK. Acc. no. 1083.
- Hortus Botanicus Nationalis, Salaspils, Latvia. Acc. no. 18143 (acknowledged as possibly U. minor 'Albo-dentata').

=== Australasia ===
- Benalla Botanic Gardens, Victoria, Australia. Accession details not known.
- Royal Botanic Gardens Victoria (Melbourne), Australia. Accession details not known.
- Eastwoodhill Arboretum , Gisborne, New Zealand. Acc. details not known.
- Geelong Botanic Gardens, Geelong, Victoria, Australia. Acc. details not known.
- Royal Tasmanian Botanical Gardens, Hobart, Australia. Two trees on Playground Lawn.

== Nurseries ==
=== North America ===
None known.

=== Europe ===
- Noordplant Nursery, Glimmen, Netherlands

=== Australasia ===
- ETT, Wandin East, Victoria, Australia
- Fleming's Nursery , Monbulk, Victoria, Australia. (as 'Silver Elm').
- Metro Trees, Fairfield, Victoria, Australia
- Mount William, Lancefield, Victoria, Australia
