= Ornamental Gardens =

Coordinates: 45°23′21″N 75°42′28″W

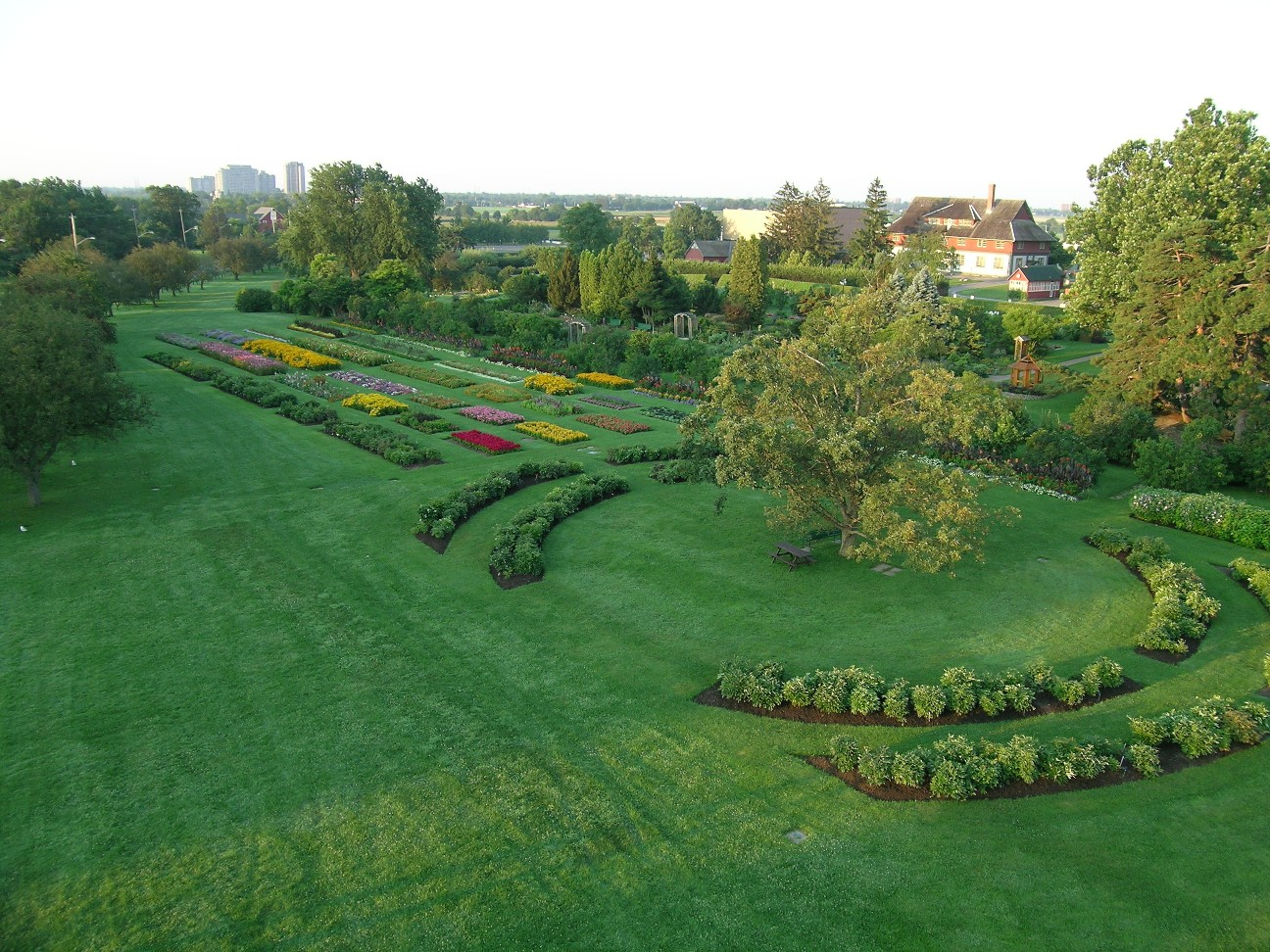
- Ariel of the Ornamental Gardens
- Address: 75 National Capital Commission Scenic Driveway, Ottawa, On K1a 0z2, Canada
- Location: Ottawa, Ontario, Canada
- Hours: 7 am-9pm
- Phone Number: (613) 230-3276
- Governing Body: Agriculture and Agri-Food Canada
- National Historic Site of Canada
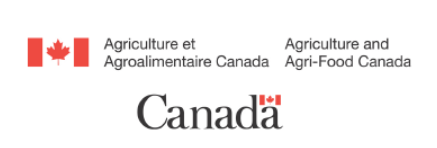

The Ornamental Gardens are an agricultural facility that emphasizes research, education, and beauty as part of Agriculture and Agri-Food Canada's Central Experimental Farm. As the name indicates, the gardens are centrally located in and now surrounded by the city of Ottawa, Ontario, Canada. The 8-acre (3.2 Ha) garden is a National Historic Site and Cultural Heritage Landscape.

The original intent was to be used as a test facility for the development of winter hardy roses, weigela and peonies. The Gardens now act as the steward to several large collections of ornamental plants. While research is still conducted, the park-like atmosphere has become an important place of recreation and education for the residents of Ottawa.

The Ornamental Gardens are bordered by Prince of Wales Drive to the South-East, National Capital Commission Scenic Driveway to the North-West, and the Research Fields to the South-West.

== History ==
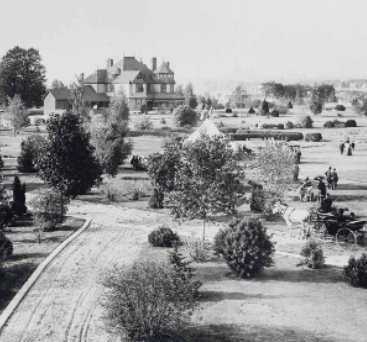
The site of the Ornamental Gardens in 1886, in what gave Williams Saunders vision for the future of the Experimental Farm

The Central Experimental Farm was one of five experimental farms developed across Canada to help and adjust climates, soil and land that was new to them. On June 2, 1886, the federal government was awarded authority in an act of Parliament to proceed with the system of research farms.

The current site of the Central Experimental Farm was founded in 1886 from a site of near wilderness sprinkled with stumps and stones across 140 acres. William Saunders was appointed the first Farm director, and at the age of 62 in October 1886, he paved the way to carve out 20 acres of field, with visions for the future amongst his passion for flowers.

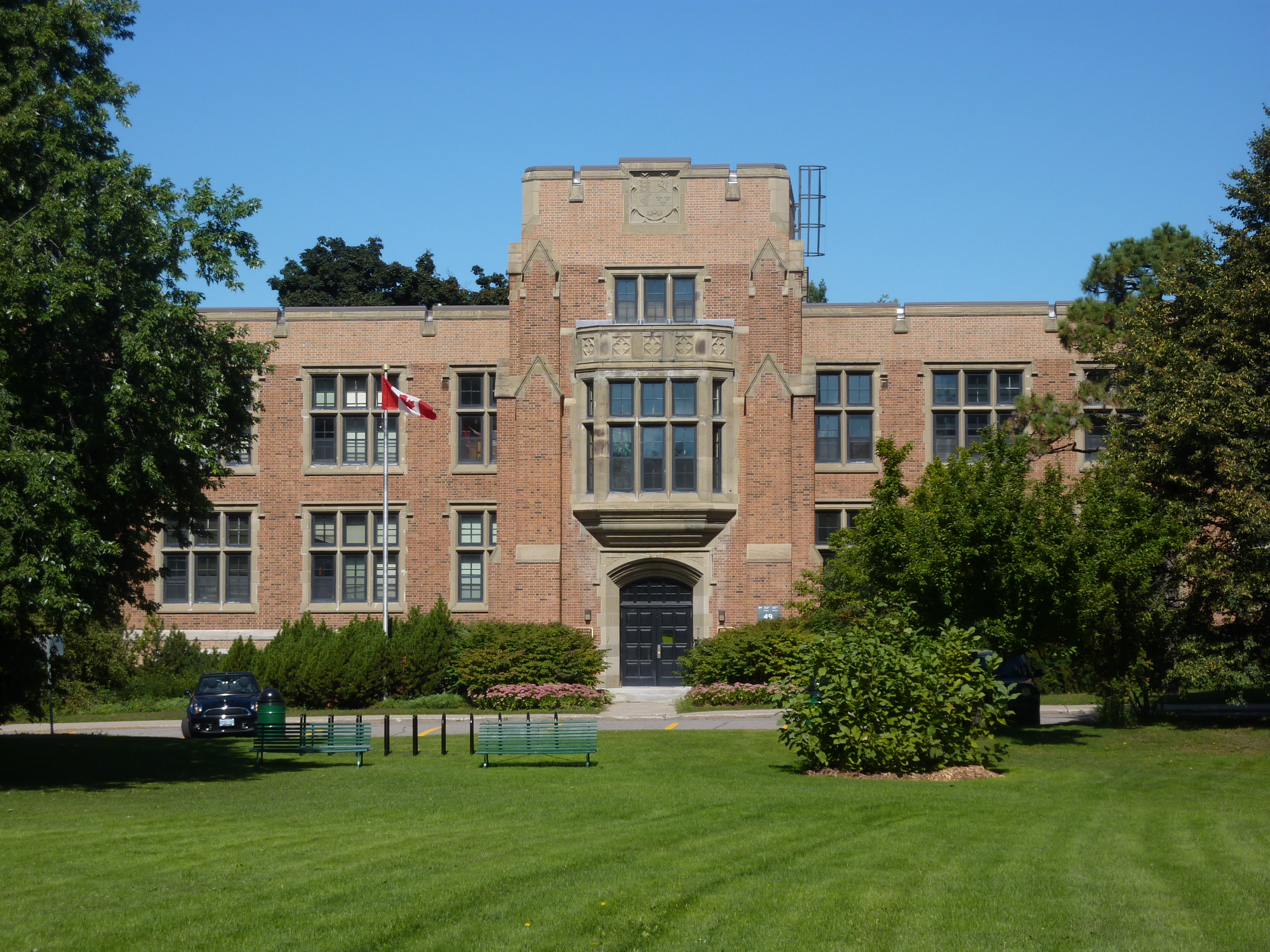
The current William Saunders Building at the Central Experimental Farm

With newly appointed horticulturalist William T. Macoun, the first flower garden was located on the main campus lawn adjacent from Saunders residence (the current William Saunders Building). This started Saunders plans for the garden from 12-years prior to develop the forest to a modern example of the current ornamental gardens.

After 25 years as Director of the Experimental Farm, Saunders appointed Hans T. Gussow on January 1, 1911. Where he believed "a true botanical (ornamental) garden should be for purposes of economic application and scientific study".

By 1920, the Central Experimental Farm and the Ornamental Gardens had Isabella Preston forming new roots. On September 9, 1922, she was made a permanent specialist in ornamental horticulture where she would cultivate new plants for Canadian gardens and building an international reputation for the Central Experimental Farm.

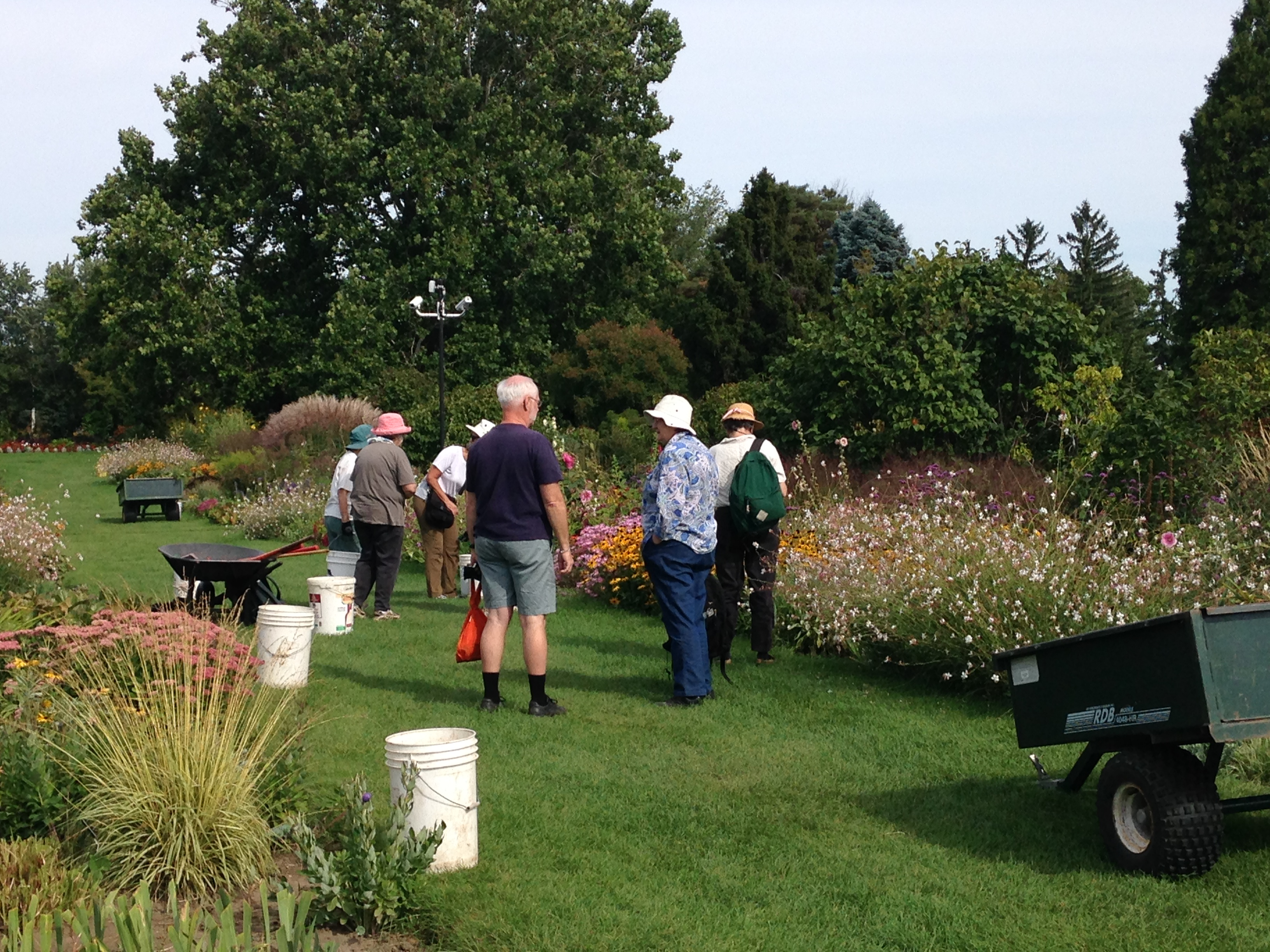
Working on the property of the current Ornamental Gardens

There have been multiple phases to modern-day development of the property due to primary research, education and landscape. These changes have undergone physical movements, redesigns, expansions, neglections, restorations, and rebuilds. Recently AAFC Staff and volunteers have restored the rose, peony, lilac and iris collections, in which were designed to honour the work of Ottawa's Isabella Preston and Felicitas Svejda. As since the 1890s, the Ornamental Gardens have been displaying historical and new varieties of flowers and shrubs.

== Features ==
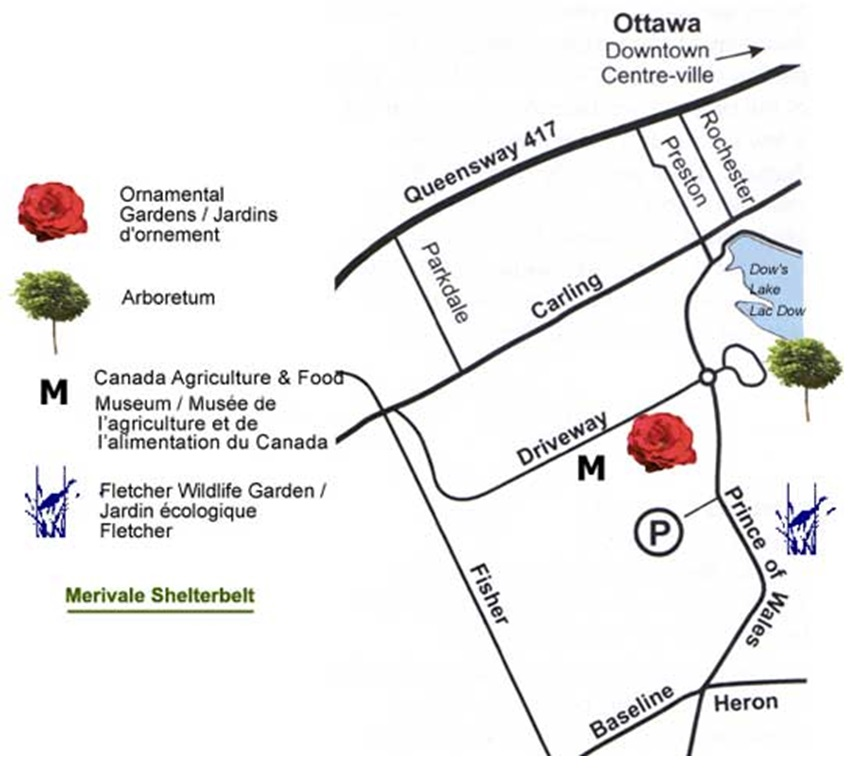
Simplified map of the Central Experimental Farm attractions

The Ornamental Gardens are currently one of five public areas associated with the Central Experimental farm. These include the Dominion Arboretum, Tropical Greenhouses, Merivale Shelterbelt, and the Canada Agriculture and Food Museum.

In order to provide a proper environment for the many plant collections the Ornamental Gardens has been subdivided into several features ranging from important buildings, collections, series and memorials.

Additionally, for support of the public, there is a public washroom available for all members of the public located at building 85 of the Central Experimental farm in which is adjacent to the National Capital Commission Driveway.

=== Major features ===
- The Perennial Collection
- The Rock collection
- The Rose garden
- The Annuals garden
- The Macoun Memorial Garden The Hedge Garden
- Isabella Preston lilac series
- Arthur Percy Saunders peonies

=== Notable buildings ===
1. Building 49: William Saunders Building
2. Building 50: Historical Greenhouse Complex
3. Building 55: Horticulture Building
4. Building 75: Cereal Crops Building
  - Composed of a laboratory with a greenhouse to the rear that has been contributed to the Central Experimental Farm's agriculture science since 1889.
5. Building 77: Potting Shed
  - The shingled, flared roof and cross-gable roof is recognized as a Federal Heritage Building as it worked to promote the Central Experimental Farm's agriculture reform in the 19th century.

== Collections ==
The display garden for the AAS (All American Selection) of the Ornamental Gardens presents a yearly display of annuals and perennials and is home to its five primary collections: lilacs, heritage roses, peonies, explorer roses, and irises and daylilies.

=== Lilacs ===
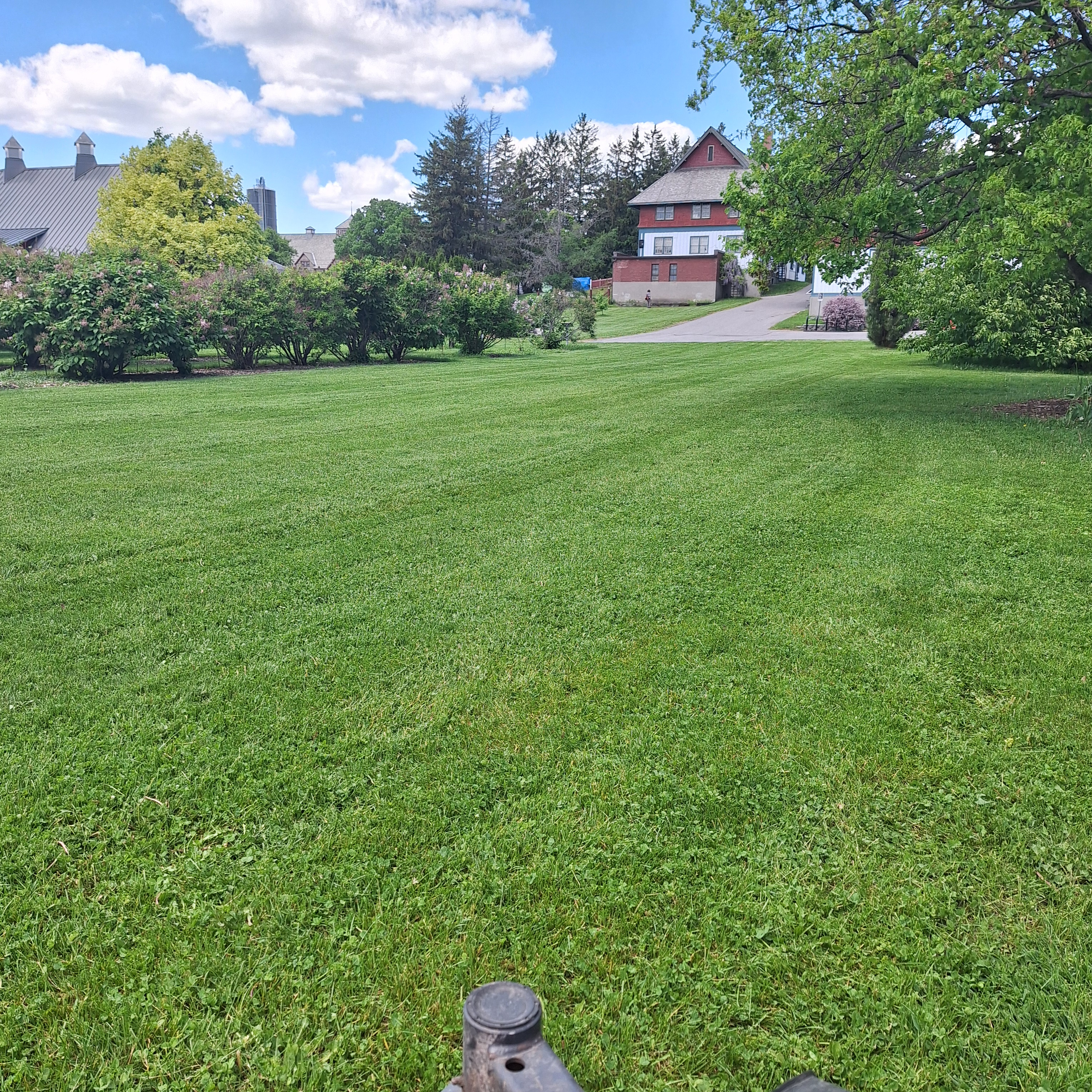
Located near the Lilac series collection and building 77 of the Ornamental Gardens

Amongst the first plantings on the Central Experimental Farm grounds were 15 lilacs, despite having been first introduced in the Dominion Arboretum. By 1919, the lilacs were moved into the Ornamental Gardens to create the lilac walks currently open for viewing with over 340 lilacs encompassing 262 variations. In 1982, under presentation and cultivation of the lilacs, Agriculture and Agri-Food Canada was awarded from the International Lilac Society for its lilac cultivators and educating the public on the beauty and use of lilacs.

=== Heritage roses ===
Under William Saunders, the first roses were established in 1886, and by 1895 there was a published list of “desirable” roses. Years were spent testing and cultivating for perfectly formed varieties. Cultivation was led by rose breeders for over 90 years from supervision under William Saunders to Isabella Preston. The Heritage Rose Garden was considered a millennium project of rectangular beds containing once-only blooming roses and contain repeat bloomers.

=== Peonies ===
The Peony Garden was redesigned in 2001 and currently consists of 12 garden beds with more than 600 peonies. William Saunders first introduced peonies in the 1890s, as his son A.P. Saunders was an influential peony breeder, who cultivated the 'Saunders Hybrids'. This collection has become the largest collection of peonies in North America.

=== Explorer roses ===
Agriculture and Agri-Food Canada began a rose breeding program in the 1960s under Felicitas Svejda. This program would develop the Explorer series, that is a set of hardy roses variations developed to withstand the harsh Canadian climates, particularly with the ability to survive in -35 °C when snow-covered. Svejda was successfully involved in the first thirteen cultivars, in which would be named after Canadian explorers in hopes of proving they were as 'tough and versatile as their namesakes'. This would develop the Explorer Rose garden, as a Canadian-made collection and one of Agriculture and Agri-Food Canada's most impressive horticultural success stories. The collection was officially opened in July 2005, and current AAFC staff and a dedicated team of volunteers have combined the original collection from the original bushes with more recent varieties for improved displays.

=== Irises and daylilies ===
There are 14 separate garden beds that form concentric circles, with four corners squaring the pattern. In the inner circle and four corners there is presence of Siberian Irises, the middle circle contains Bearded Irises, while the outer circle contains daylilies. This area was designed in 2003, by former AAFC Lead Hand Sharon Saunders to form a Victorian-style garden that represents the varied forms of colours of daylilies.

=== Perennials ===
Perennials are hardy, herbaceous plants that can survive year around because of there underground organs that enter a state of dormancy during autumn months. These plants are a value to sustainable agriculture, as the field of horticulture provides technologies to improve the yields of plant growth. The ability for annual growth promotes weed control and improved soil health and biodiversity with the reduction in fertilizer usage.

== Mineral composition ==
The horticulture industry is more than continuous growth and development of plants. Every chosen species in an environment has its own chemical composition. The Ornamental Gardens show presence of agrominerals, in which demonstrate mineral substance mixtures of mineral and organic substances. The dominant chemical composition facilitated in the garden is concentrations of three vital macronutrients for plant growth, consisting of nitrogen, potassium, and phosphorus.

=== Nitrogen ===
Nitrogen is an essential macronutrient for plants, that determines development and productivity through variations of abiotic stress responses. Agriculture and Agri-Food Canada follows a continuous process, that begins with preparation in the Tropical Greenhouses at the Central Experimental Farm during the spring months. A series of chosen annuals are pricked and seeded and into garden pots containing Pro-Mix Potting Soil.

==== Pro-Mix potting soil ====
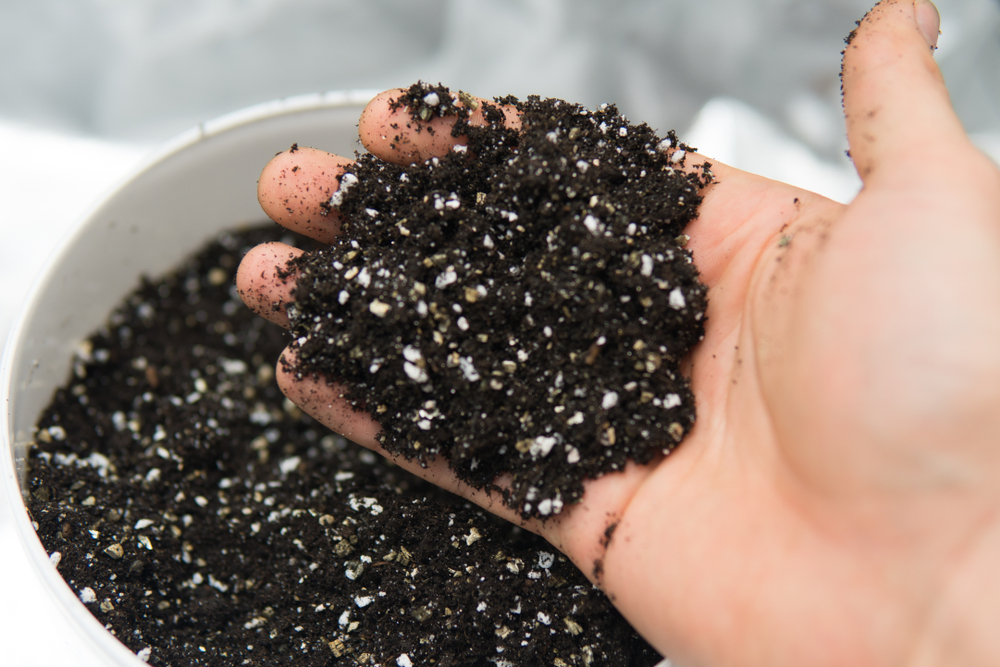
White appearance gives evidence of Nitrogen

Pro-Mix potting soil is a starter fertilizer that contains 7% total nitrogen to help plants acclimate to a new rooting system. Nitrogen is a fundamental mineral in soil for plant health, and is critical to plants' growth and reproduction. Usage provides an increase in nutrient and water uptake because of the symbiotic relationship and stimulation of fungi that colonizes the root tissue. This leads to a better integration of moisture management with a larger root system that causes an increased plant growth capacity.

==== Nitrogen-fixing plants ====
Nitrogen-fixing plants located in the Ornamental Gardens are present in the forms of clover and alfalfa. These plants are a natural way to increase nitrogen content in soil. The roots of the plants colonize to extract nitrogen from the air and turn into nitrogen for bacterial growth, and once the bacteria no longer require the nitrogen it becomes available to all plants.

===== Clover =====
Clover is a perennial plant that has the potential to produce 50-200 Ibs/acre of fixed nitrogen. In essence the clover supplies carbohydrates to the root nodules and used to convert atmospheric nitrogen into a form utilized by a plant to benefit grasses through transfer in soil.

=== Phosphorus ===
Phosphorus is the second most frequent macronutrient behind nitrogen. In which makes up 0.2% of a plant's dry weight, with essential components of nucleic acids, phospholipids, and adenosine triphosphate (ATP) to present a reliable supply to control key enzyme reactions and regulation of metabolic pathways. Substances work to correlate and intertwine to initiate greater outcomes. Phosphorus promotes nitrogen uptake by enhancing nitrogen retention in ecosystems. The principle of regulating phosphorus is essential for cell division and development of growing plants. Improvement allows a greater capacity for plants to capture, store and convert sunlight energy to biochemicals like ATP.

Predominant for perennials, as can increase yield and stand longevity. Where the usage of phosphorus provides the ability to increase and improve plant water use and other nutrients efficiencies. Plant roots can only acquire phosphorus from the soil when the phosphorus is dissolved in soil water.

=== Potassium ===
Potassium is relatively abundant in the earth's crust making up approximately 2.1% of the weight and is mined in the form of potash, sylvite, carnallite, and langbeinite. This is a necessity for the function of all living cells as potassium becomes a vital macronutrient that increases root function and improves drought resistance. Plant survival with potassium usage has a responsibility of vital enzymes activating and regulating the water balance and uptake while protecting and mitigating abiotic induced stresses to maintain homeostasis.

These measures are crucial as it demonstrates the importance of photosynthesis. There are responses to light, as the use of potassium regulates the opening of the stomata that in such regulates the uptake of CO_{2}. Potassium uptake is dependent on adenosine triphosphate (ATP) as it provides energy for chemical and physiological processes while facilitating protein and starch synthesis in plants.

Usage of potassium in modern gardens and landscaping is present in the Ornamental Gardens through the natural process of filtration through constant grass clippings in which provide the soil with nutrients that contribute to preventing weed growth while preserving moisture.

== See also ==
- Agriculture and Agri-Food Canada
- List of botanical gardens in Canada
- Dominion Arboretum
- Canada Agriculture and Food Museum
