= Ornamental plant =

Plant that is grown for decorative purposes

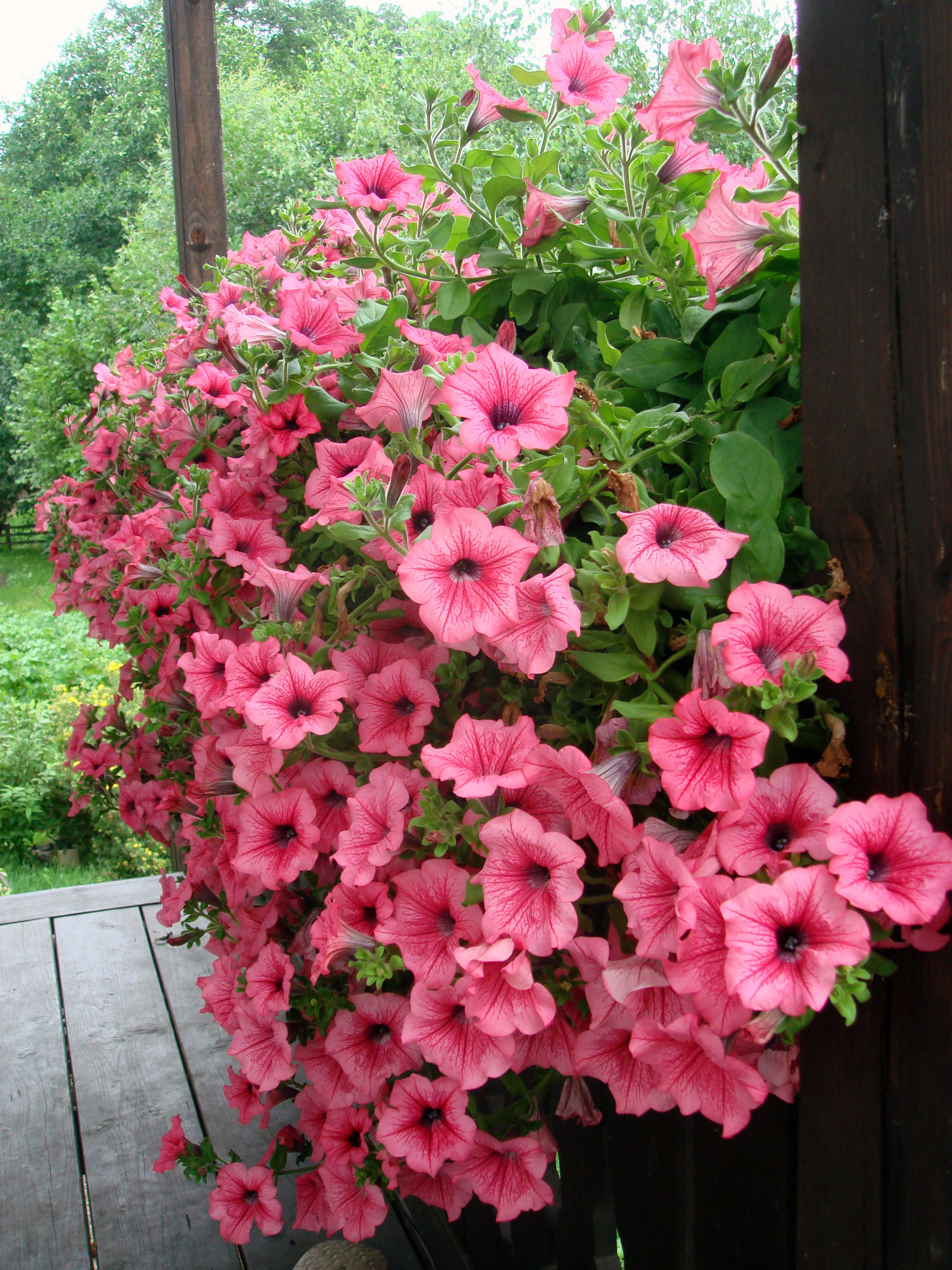
Ornamental petunia plant

Ornamental plants are plants that are primarily grown because of their appearance, or for qualities such as scent or how they shape physical space. Many flowering plants and garden varieties tend to be cultivars specially bred for qualities such as color, shape, scent, and long-lasting blooms. However, "ornamental plant" is not a category recognised in scientific botany, as many garden plants are of the original species, not altered by plant breeding.

Almost all types of plants have ornamental varieties: trees, shrubs, climbers, grasses, succulents, aquatic plants, herbaceous perennials and annual plants. Non-botanical classifications include houseplants, bedding plants, hedges, plants for cut flowers and foliage plants. The cultivation of ornamental plants is floriculture and tree nurseries.

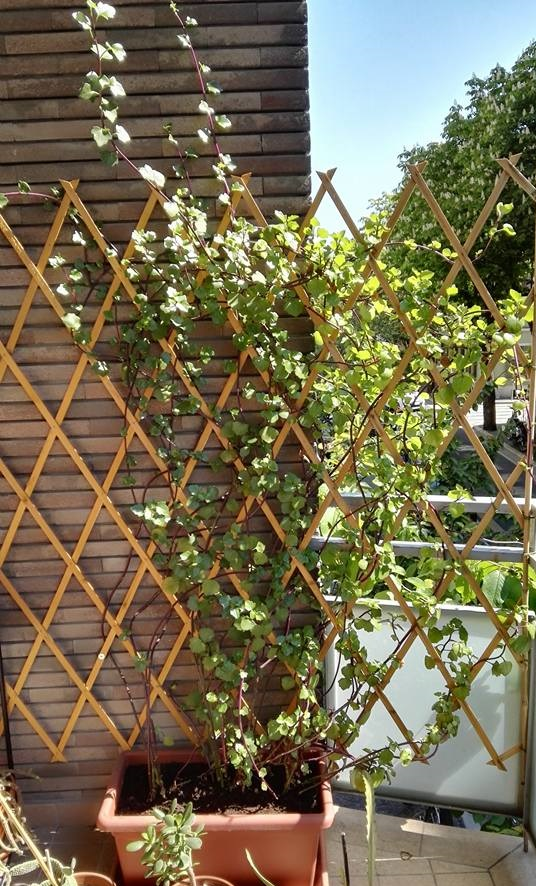
Ornamental trailing plant on a trellis (creeping groundsel).

Commonly, ornamental garden plants are grown for the display of aesthetic features including flowers, leaves, scent, overall foliage texture, fruit, stem, and bark. In some cases, unusual features may be considered to be of interest, such as the prominent thorns of Rosa sericea and cacti.

== Uses ==
Ornamental plants are plants that are primarily grown for display purposes, rather than functional ones. They are often used in ornamental gardening.

Some ornamental plants are foliage plants grown mainly or entirely for their foliage, which may be deciduous or evergreen. The appearance of some ornamental foliage is created by lacy leaves or long needles, while some ornamental plants are grown for distinctively colored leaves, such as silvery-gray ground covers and bright red grasses.

Other ornamental plants are cultivated for their blooms. Flowering ornamental plants are an aspect of many gardens, with some flower gardeners preferring to plant a variety of flowers so that the garden is continuously in flower through the spring and summer. Some ornamental plants also produce distinctive smells.

== History ==
The cultivation of ornamental plants in gardening began in ancient civilizations around 2000 BC. Ancient Egyptian tomb paintings of 1500 BC show physical evidence of ornamental horticulture and landscape design; for example, the pharaohs of Amun grew many different kinds of ornamental plants.

== Cultivation ==
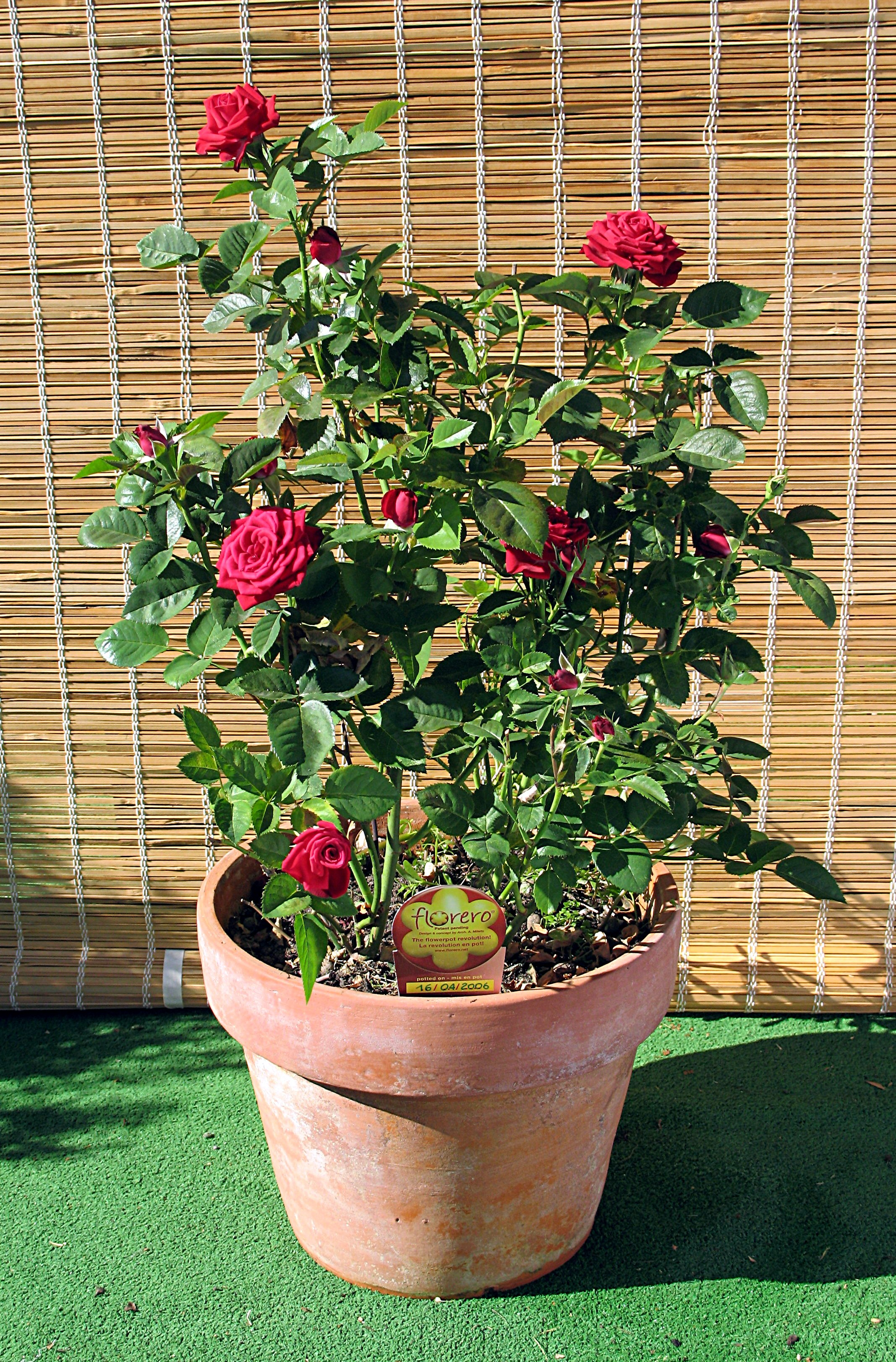
Meillandine Rose in clay pot

Ornamental plants and trees are distinguished from utilitarian and crop plants, such as those used for agriculture and vegetable crops, and for forestry or as fruit trees. However, plants can be grown for both ornamental qualities and other purposes. An example of this is lavender, which is grown as both an ornamental plant and as a crop plant for the production of lavender oil.

== Term ==
In the horticultural trades, ornamental plants are often just referred to as "ornamentals". The term "ornamental plant" largely corresponds to "garden plant", though the latter is less precise, as any plant may be grown in a garden. While some plants are both ornamental and functional, people usually use the term "ornamental plants" to refer to plants which have no value beyond being attractive.

== Ornamental grasses ==
Ornamental grasses are often used in home landscapes due to their versatility and ease of care in addition to appearance. They can be true grasses (Poaceae) or other families of grass-like plants such as sedges (Cyperaceae), rushes (Juncaceae), restios (Restionaceae), and cat-tails (Typhaceae). All are monocotyledons, typically with narrow leaves and parallel veins. Most are herbaceous perennials, though many are evergreen and some develop woody tissues.

Ornamental grasses are popular in many colder hardiness zones for their resilience to cold temperatures and aesthetic value even in the fall and winter seasons.

== See also ==
- Ornamental bulbous plant
- Ornamental Gardens, Ottawa
