= Alan Gussow =

American painter

- Born: May 8, 1931; New York, NY, USA
- Died: May 5, 1997 (aged 65)
- Movement: Abstract Expressionism
- Awards: Prix de Rome, American Academy and Institute of Arts and Letters Award in Art

Alan Gussow (May 8, 1931 – May 5, 1997) was an American artist, teacher, author and conservationist.

== Life and education ==
Gussow was born May 8, 1931, in New York City but grew up in Rockville Centre, NY. He took art classes at the Pratt Institute before graduating from Middlebury College in 1952 with a degree in Literature. The following year, while studying painting at Cooper Union, he was awarded the Prix de Rome. Only 21 years old, he was the youngest ever to have won the award at that time. By the time he left New York to study at the American Academy in Rome from 1953 to 1955, Gussow had learned printmaking from Stanley William Hayter, and was already heavily influenced by Paul Klee, Arshile Gorky, and Stuart Davis.

In 1956, Gussow married Joan Dye, who was then a Time magazine researcher and later a nutritionist and chair of the nutrition department at Columbia Teacher's College. Together, they made a home with their sons in the Hudson River Valley, where they eventually became avid organic gardeners, incorporating into their home garden a method of biodynamic double digging championed by Alan Chadwick. Balancing his art with teaching jobs, writing, and environmental activism, Gussow made yearly painting trips to Monhegan Island, ME and kept a studio in his New York home. He died from cancer May 5, 1997, in Piermont, NY.

== Art ==
Gussow cited his walks through the Middlebury college campus in Vermont as some of his original inspiration to become an artist. His early paintings created in the 1950s and 1960s are landscapes of a more traditional nature, depicting scenes painted from a separate vantage point.

In 1980, Gussow experienced what he would later describe as a pivotal realization when he traveled with his wife to Australia and was captivated by aboriginal art. Profoundly moved by the role art played in these communities, Gussow severed his gallery connection upon returning home and began to experiment with art as a process instead of as a product. In 1982 his International Shadow Project was a prime example of his belief that an artist's duty is to connect people to their shared potential to change the world around them. On the 40th anniversary of the bombings on Hiroshima, the project involved 15,000 people painting silhouettes in the streets of 400 cities all over the world in an act of creative remembrance.

Gussow's first solo museum show was in 1961 at the Washington County Museum of Fine Arts in Hagerstown, MD; he has since been the focus of more than 50 one-man exhibitions and has been included in over 60 group shows internationally. After 20 years of representation by the Peridot Gallery and Joan T. Washburn, Gussow's work has shown at the Sid Deutsch Gallery, MB Modern, Gavin Brown's Enterprise and Babcock Galleries. His work can be found in numerous museums as well as public and private collections in the U.S. and abroad.

== Gussow as an activist, author, and educator ==
Gussow's first involvement in environmental activism was in 1965 when he played a role in preventing a proposed Con Edison plant that would have destroyed Storm King Mountain in the Hudson Valley. With others, he went on to found the Citizen's Committee for the Hudson River, and brought Senator Robert F. Kennedy to the Hudson to explain the dangers facing the river. Gussow testified before Congress on environmental issues and advised George McGovern when he was a senator and embarking on his presidential campaign. As a consultant for the National Park Service, he implemented and inaugurated the Artist in Residence program in the National Parks.

Gussow was an active teacher for 40 years. He played a significant role in establishing the fine arts program at the Parsons School of Design, where he taught through 1968, and also taught at Sarah Lawrence College, the University of Massachusetts, Middlebury College, and the University of California, Santa Cruz where he held positions in both the Environmental Studies and the Art Department.

Gussow's publications include 13 articles, essays and monographs. His book, A Sense of Place: The Artist and the American Land, published in 1972, couples works by American landscape artists spanning four centuries with excerpts of their own writing. Both this book as well as his 1993 publication, The Artist as Native: Reinventing Regionalism, inspired major gallery exhibitions.
