= Joan Dye Gussow =

American academic, author and environmentalist (1928–2025)

Joan Dye Gussow (October 4, 1928 – March 7, 2025) was an American academic, author, food policy expert, environmentalist, and gardener. The New York Times has called her the "matriarch of the eat-locally-think-globally food movement."

== Biography ==
Born in Alhambra, California, on October 4, 1928, Gussow grew up in a California landscape dominated by clear skies, orange groves, peach orchards, and lines of eucalyptus trees. She graduated from Pomona College in Claremont, California in 1950, with a BA (pre-medical) and moved east to New York City. In 1956, she married Alan Gussow (1931–1997). Gussow spent seven years as a researcher at Time Magazine and five years as a suburban wife and mother. After becoming a researcher at Yeshiva’s Graduate School of Education, she returned to school in 1969 to earn an M.Ed and an Ed. D. in Nutrition Education from Columbia's Teachers College. Shortly after graduating, she was hired by Teachers College to become the chair of the nutrition department, creating the legendary course, Nutritional Ecology.

In 1971, she testified in front of a Congressional Committee about the poor quality of the foods advertised to children on television. Her testimony was also published in the Journal of Nutrition Education scandalizing significant portions of her chosen profession.

Gussow had served in a number of capacities for various public, private, and governmental organizations, including chairing the Boards of the National Gardening Association, the Society for Nutrition Education, the Jesse Smith Noyes Foundation, Rockland Farm Alliance, and Just Food, serving two terms on the Food and Nutrition Board of the National Academy of Sciences, a term on the FDA's Food Advisory Committee, and a term on the National Organic Standards Board.

Gussow was the first Mary Swartz Rose Professor emerita and former chair of the Nutrition Education Program at Teachers College, Columbia University, where she had been a long-time analyst and critic of the U.S. food system. In her classic 1978 book The Feeding Web: Issues in Nutritional Ecology, which tracked the environmental hazards of an increasingly globalizing food system, she foreshadowed by several decades the current interest in relocalizing the food supply. This manifesto had also made her one of the most influential people in food thinking. She influenced the likes of Barbara Kingsolver, Michael Pollan, and Marion Nestle.

Her subsequent books include The Nutrition Debate (1986), Chicken Little, Tomato Sauce and Agriculture (1991), and This Organic Life: Confessions of a Suburban Homesteader (2001), the latter based on the lessons learned from transitioning to growing virtually all of her own food at the home she shared with her husband in Piermont, New York; her husband, Alan, died while she was writing the book. Her 2010 book, Growing, Older, is as its subtitle suggests, a garden-based collection of “reflections on death, life and vegetables”.

In addition to her books, she also produced a variety of articles on food-related topics. Gussow lived, wrote, and grew organic vegetables on the west bank of the Hudson River. She was at work on a new book based on the complete destruction and miraculous resurrection of her beloved garden. Her tentative title: “Starting Over at 81”.

Gussow died at her home in Piermont from congestive heart failure on March 7, 2025, at the age of 96.

== Bibliography ==
=== Books ===
- The Feeding Web: Issues in Nutritional Ecology. Berkley: Bull Pub Co. June 1978. ISBN 978-0915950157.
- The Nutrition Debate: Sorting Out Some Answers. Berkley: Bull Publishing Company. 1986. ISBN 978-0915950669
- Chicken Little, Tomato Sauce and Agriculture: Who Will Produce Tomorrow's Food? Bootstrap Press. 1991. ISBN 978-0942850321
- This Organic Life: Confessions of a Suburban Homesteader. Chelsea Green Publishing. 2002. ISBN 978-1931498241.
- Growing, Older: A Chronicle of Death, Life, and Vegetables. Chelsea Green Publishing. 2010. ISBN 978-1603582926.

=== Essays ===
- Gussow, Joan (May 1980). “Nutrition education in a world of limits.” 50th ANZAAS Congress, Adelaide.
- Gussow, Joan (Summer 1980). "Who Pays the Piper". Teachers College Record.
- Gussow, Joan (November/December 1980). "Some Impractical Thoughts on Television & Nutritional Education.” Food Monitor.
- Gussow, Joan (October/December 1980). “The Science and Politics of Nutrition Education.” Journal of Nutrition Education.
- Gussow, Joan (March 1981). “Growth, Truth, and Responsibility: Food is the Bottom Line”. The Institute of Nutrition of the University of North Carolina.
- Gussow, Joan (May/June 1982). "PCB’s for Breakfast & Other Problems of a Food System Gone Awry". Food Monitor.
- Gussow, Joan (July/August 1983). “Food: Wanting & Needing & Providing.” Food Monitor.
- Gussow, Joan (February 1985). “Women and Food.” Country Journal.
- Gussow, Joan (June 29, 2009). "The Many Wonders of Plants". Ecoliteracy.
