= Hans Theodor Güssow =

- Portrait photograph of Güssow (date unknown)
- Born: 1879; Breslau
- Died: 1961 (aged 81–82); Vancouver
- Occupation: Plant pathologist

Hans Theodor Güssow (1879–1961) was a Canadian plant pathologist. Güssow was born in Breslau, Germany (today known as Wrocław, part of Poland) and educated at universities in Breslau, Leipzig and Berlin. In 1903 he moved to the UK to work as an assistant to William Carruthers who was the botanist for the Royal Agricultural Society. He later emigrated to Canada after being appointed Dominion botanist by Sydney Arthur Fisher. World War I had a "devastating effect" on Güssow's life. In a meeting between farmers and others he was referred to as "that German in Ottawa" and fellow plant pathologists petitioned the Minister of Agriculture to appoint a new Dominion botanist who could "command their confidence". He went on to become the first president of the Canadian Phytopathological Society in 1929. He was an advocate of the need to establish biosecurity regulations to prevent the spread of plant pests and diseases. He addressed international congresses in the Netherlands and New York in 1923 and 1926 respectively, which led to the International Plant Protection Conference held in Rome in 1929 at which 26 countries signed a new International Convention for the Protection of Plants.
