= Ulmus minor 'Atinia Variegata' =

Elm cultivar

- Species: Ulmus minor
- Cultivar: 'Atinia-Variegata'
- Origin: England

The field elm cultivar Ulmus minor 'Atinia Variegata', the variegated-leaved common english elm, formerly known as U. procera 'Argenteo-Variegata' and described by Weston (1770) as U. campestris argenteo-variegata, is believed to have originated in England in the seventeenth century and to have been cultivated since the eighteenth. The Oxford botanist Robert Plot mentioned in a 1677 Flora a variegated elm in Dorset, where English elm is the common field elm. Elwes and Henry (1913) had no doubt that the cultivar was of English origin, "as it agrees with the English elm in all its essential characters". At the Dominion Arboretum, Ottawa, the tree was listed as U. procera 'Marginata', as the variegation is sometimes most obvious on leaf-margins.

Variegated English elm is not to be confused with the more common field elm cultivar U. minor 'Argenteo-Variegata', also known as U. minor 'Variegata', the silver elm or tartan elm, which has similar markings but narrower leaves.

== Description ==
Weston described the tree as having leaves striped, spotted and margined with white. The photograph in Krüssman (1984) of a specimen in Schönaich-Carolath Park, Hamburg, shows the typical, almost orbicular leaves of English elm, but variegated. In other respects the form of the tree is similar to the type. The tree, which was the only variegated English elm in cultivation, sometimes produces variegated suckers. The naturalist Eliza Brightwen in Quiet Hours with Nature (1904) described a specimen she had in The Grove, her estate in Stanmore, Middlesex:

I happen to possess a well-grown young elm which bears cream-coloured streaked and spotted leaves; this is merely a sport of the common U. campestris, but seen amongst the dark green foliage of other trees, it is highly ornamental.

Brightwen carefully distinguishes, among field elms, between U. campestris (English elm), U. glabra Mill. (smooth-leaved elm), U. carpinifolia (narrow-leaved elm), and U. minor (small-leaved elm), so her Stanmore specimen is likely to have been, as she states, the variegated English elm cultivar, not Silver Elm.

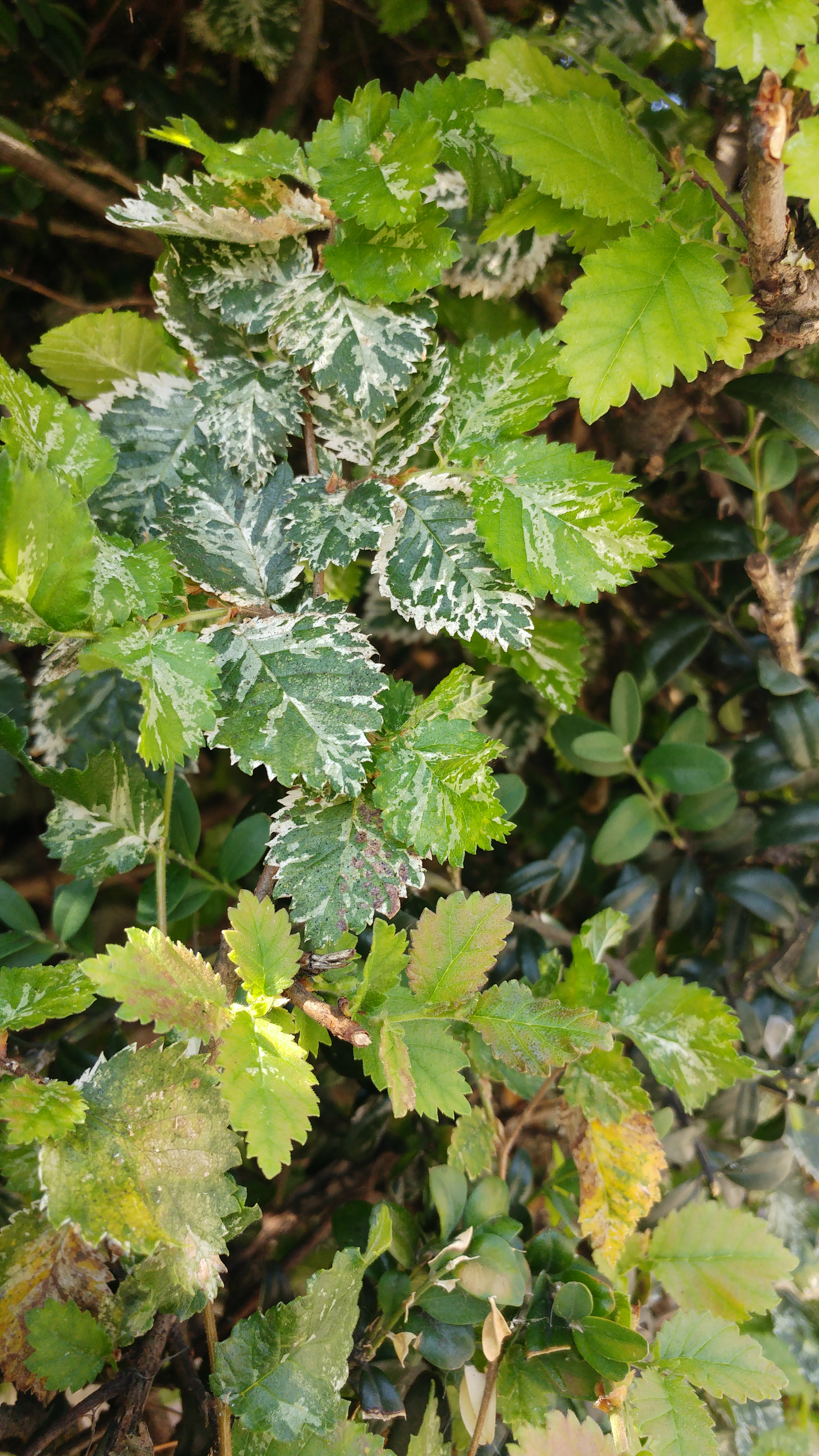
Variegated English Elm sucker leaves, Leek Wootton, Warwickshire (July 2018)

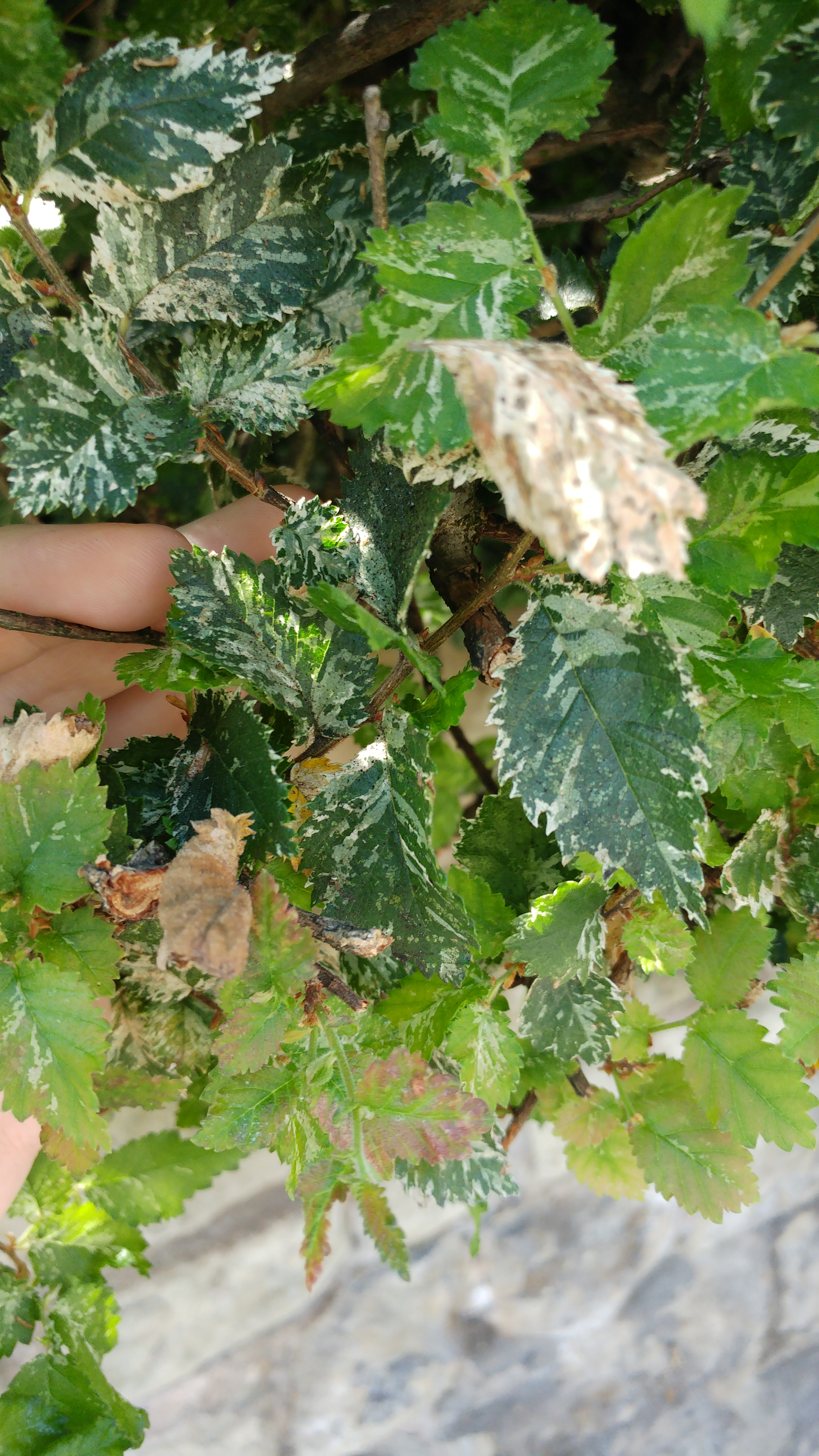

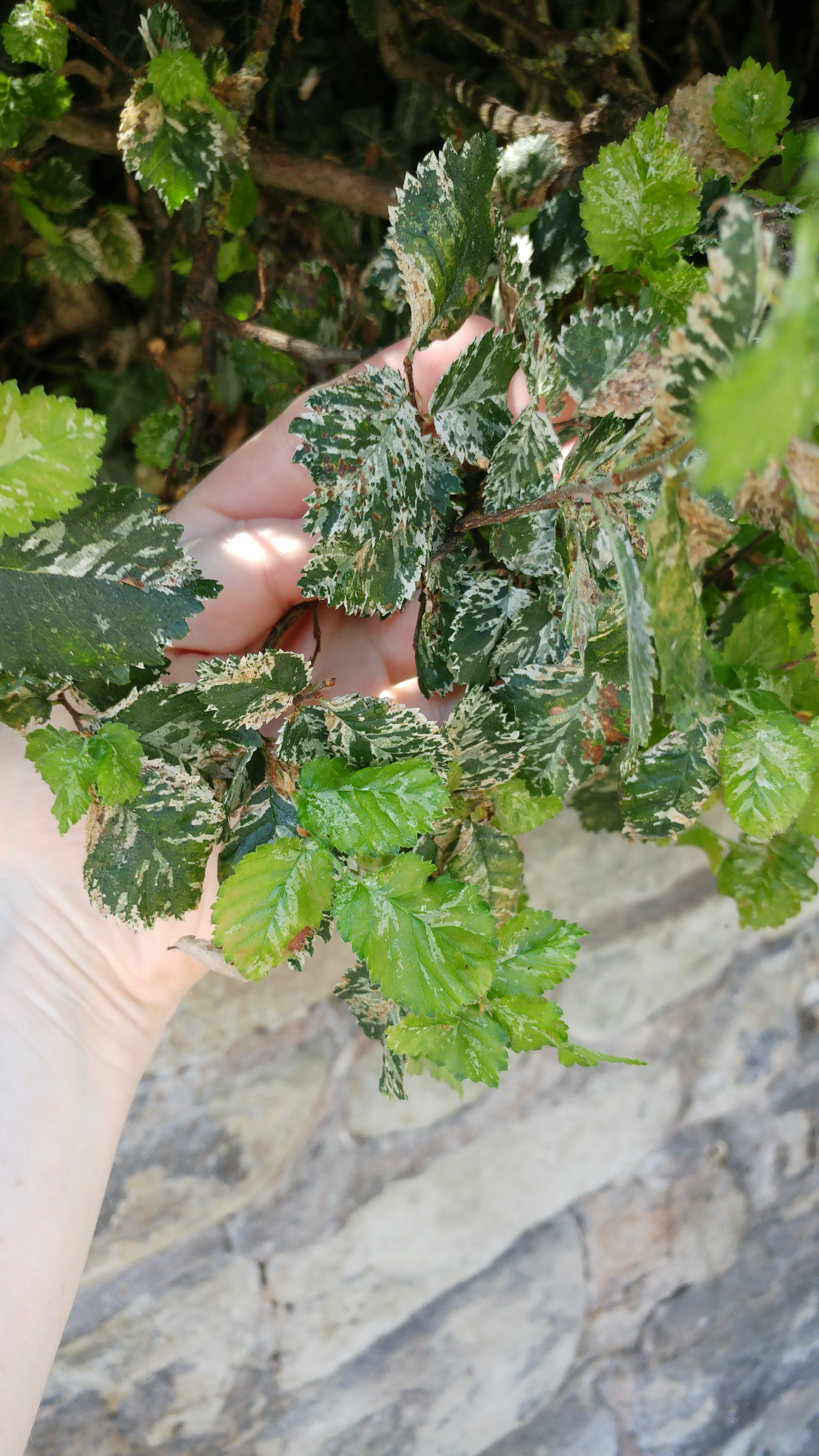

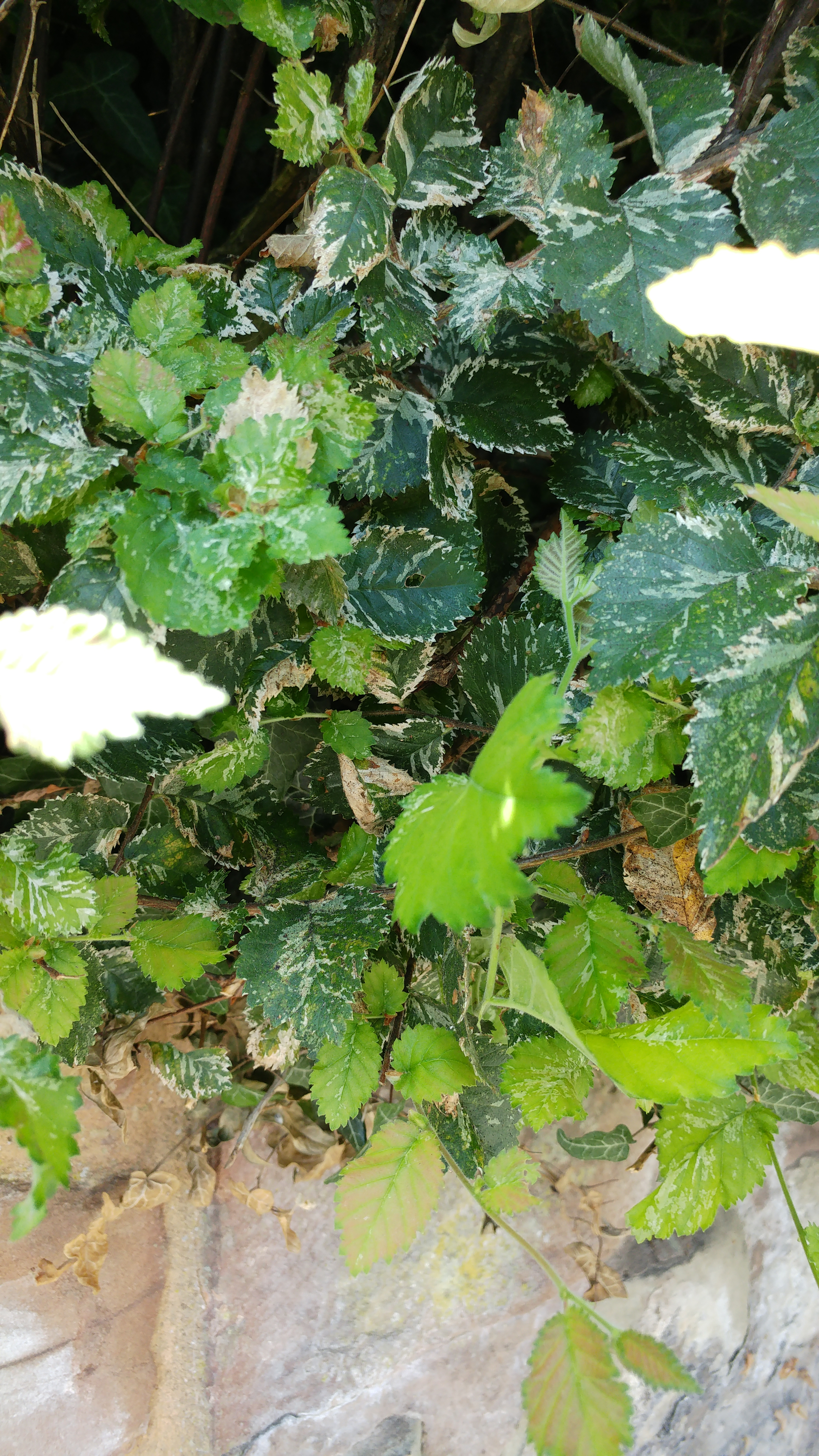

== Pests and diseases ==
'Atinia Variegata' is vulnerable to Dutch elm disease.

== Cultivation ==
Variegated English elm was in commerce from the 18th century. In the Royal Victoria Park, Bath, it was listed in the mid-19th century as U. campestris foliis variegatis, "the variegated-leaved common English elm". The Späth nursery of Berlin supplied an U. campestris fol. argenteis marginatis to the Dominion Arboretum, Ottawa, Canada in 1897, which may have been variegated English elm, as well as an U. campestris variegata argentea (1893) and an U. campestris fol. argenteis variegatis (1899), possibly silver elm or tartan elm. Hillier & Sons Nursery of Winchester, Hampshire, marketed the tree in the mid-20th century as U. procera 'Argenteo-variegata'. U. procera 'Argenteo-variegata' or U. procera 'Variegata' was also cultivated in Sweden, where specimens may survive.

The variegated cultivar now sold as U. procera 'Argenteo-Variegata' in the UK, US and Australasia, though labelled variegated 'English' elm, is always Silver Elm, U. minor 'Argenteo-Variegata'. Variegated English Elm (U. procera) is no longer in nurseries.

== Notable trees ==
A notable specimen of variegated English Elm in Leek Wootton, Warwickshire, was the subject of an article in The Gardeners' Chronicle in 1878. It was probably the "fine specimen" of variegated English Elm "on the main road between Warwick and Coventry, whose suckers were as variegated as the parent", that Bean noted in the 1930s. The tree was still standing in the 1960s, and survives (2017) as sucker regrowth (see gallery). Gerald Wilkinson reported that "great specimens" of variegated English Elm could still be seen in the early 1970s at Kew, at Kenwood (near the West Gate), and in many large gardens. The Kenwood specimen seen by Wilkinson may have been the same tree noted there by Augustine Henry, measuring 75 feet in 1909.

== Synonymy ==
- ? U. campestris fol. maculatis: Loddiges, (Hackney, London), Catalogue 1823, p. 35.
- U. campestris foliis variegatis

== Accessions ==
North America

- Brooklyn Botanic Garden, New York, US. Acc. no. 910507.

Europe

- Grange Farm Arboretum, Sutton St James, Spalding, Lincolnshire, UK. As U. minor 'Argenteovariegata'. Whips planted 2011. Acc. no. 1077.
- Hergest Croft Gardens, Kington, Herefordshire, UK. One tree, no details available.

== Nurseries ==
North America

- Foothills Nursery , Mt. Airy, North Carolina, US.
- ForestFarm , Williams, Oregon, US.

Europe

- Dulford Nurseries , Cullompton, Devon, UK.
- Goscote Nurseries Ltd. , Cossington, Leics., UK.
- Madrona Nursery , Bethersden, Kent, UK.

Australasia

- Established Tree Planters Pty. Ltd., Wandin, Victoria, Australia.
