= Alfred Wesmael =

Belgian professor of botany

Alfred Wesmael (11 February 1832, in Saint-Josse-ten-Noode – 9 November 1905, in Nimy) was a Belgian professor of botany. His outstanding work in taxonomy saw him invited to become Visiting Professor at the University of Washington.

He worked as a répétiteur of courses in botany at the Ecole d’horticulture de Vilvorde, later being named director of the botanical gardens in Mons. At Mons he was also director of the Société d’Agriculture, d’Horticulture et de Zoologie. In 1867, with Daniel Rapin (1799–1882), he participated in plant collection activities in Switzerland.

His taxonomic findings were mainly published in the Bulletin de la Société Royale de Botanique de Belgique. His treatment of the genus Populus was included in Candolle's "Prodromus Systematis Naturalis Regni Vegetabilis".

== Publications ==
- 1865. Monographie des saules de la flore belge et des espèces les plus répandues dans les cultures, Federation of the Horticultural Societies of Belgium.
- 1866. Description et histoire des végétaux ligneux qui croissent spontanément en Belgique ou qui sont cultivés dans les forêts.
- 1891. Revue critique des espèces du genre Acer.
- 1892. Monographie des espèces du genre Fraxinus.
- 1892. Leçons préparatoires a l'étude des sciences naturelles. 32 pp., il.
- Notice sur les Tilleuls forestiers de Belgique.
