= Karl Theodor Rümpler =

German botanist and horticulturist

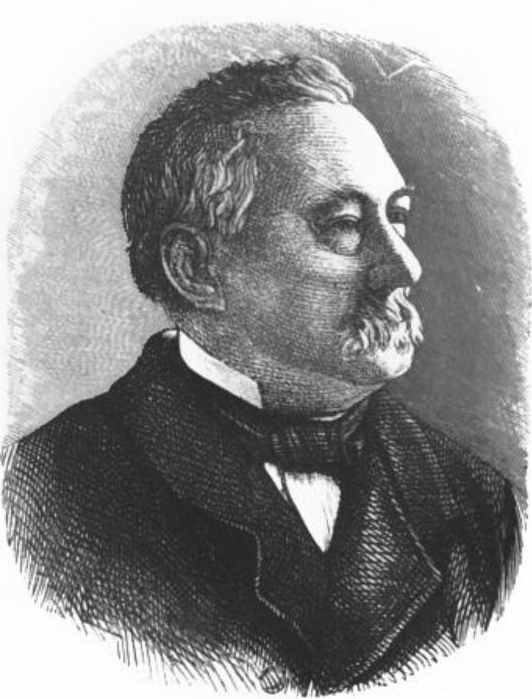

Karl Theodor Rümpler (1817 in Alterstedt – 23 May 1891 in Erfurt) was a German botanist and horticulturist.

He developed a passion for botany in his youth, and studied natural sciences at the gymnasium in Mühlhausen, where one of his classmates was Wilhelm Gerhard Walpers. He later took classes in botany, zoology and foreign languages at the University of Berlin. Beginning in 1852 he was associated with the Gärtner-Lehr-Anstalt zu Erfurt (a gardener-teaching institution in Erfurt) as an instructor and inspector.

In 1860 he became secretary of the Erfurter Gartenbauvereins (Erfurt Horticultural Association) as well as secretary of the county agricultural association. From 1873 onward, he was director of the newly established agricultural school in Erfurt.

He is remembered for his investigations of the family Cactaceae, and was the taxonomic authority of numerous cactus species. In 1886, he published a new edition of Karl Friedrich Förster's 1846 "Handbuch der Cacteenkunde in ihrem ganzen Umfange".

== Selected works ==
- Erfurt's Land- und Gartenbau in seinen wichtigsten Entwickelungs-Momenten, 1865 – Erfurt's agriculture and horticulture in its most important moments of development.
- Die Gartenblumen, ihre Beschreibung, Anzucht und Pflege, 1876 – The flower garden, description, cultivation and care.
- Illustriertes Gartenbau-Lexikon. Unter Mitwirkung zahlreicher Fachmänner aus Wissenschaft und Praxis, 1882 – Illustrated horticulture, etc. (1902 edition)
- Karl Friedrich Förster's Handbuch der Cacteenkunde in ihrem ganzen Umfange, 1886 (2 volumes) – Karl Friedrich Förster's handbook of Cactaceae in its whole extent.
- Die Sukkulenten (Fettplanzen und Kakteen) : Beschreibung, Abbildung und Kultur derselben, 1892 (with Karl Schumann) – Succulent plants (succulents and cacti): description, illustration and culture.
