= Dominion Arboretum =

Arboretum in Ottawa, Ontario

Coordinates: 45°23′27″N 75°42′16″W

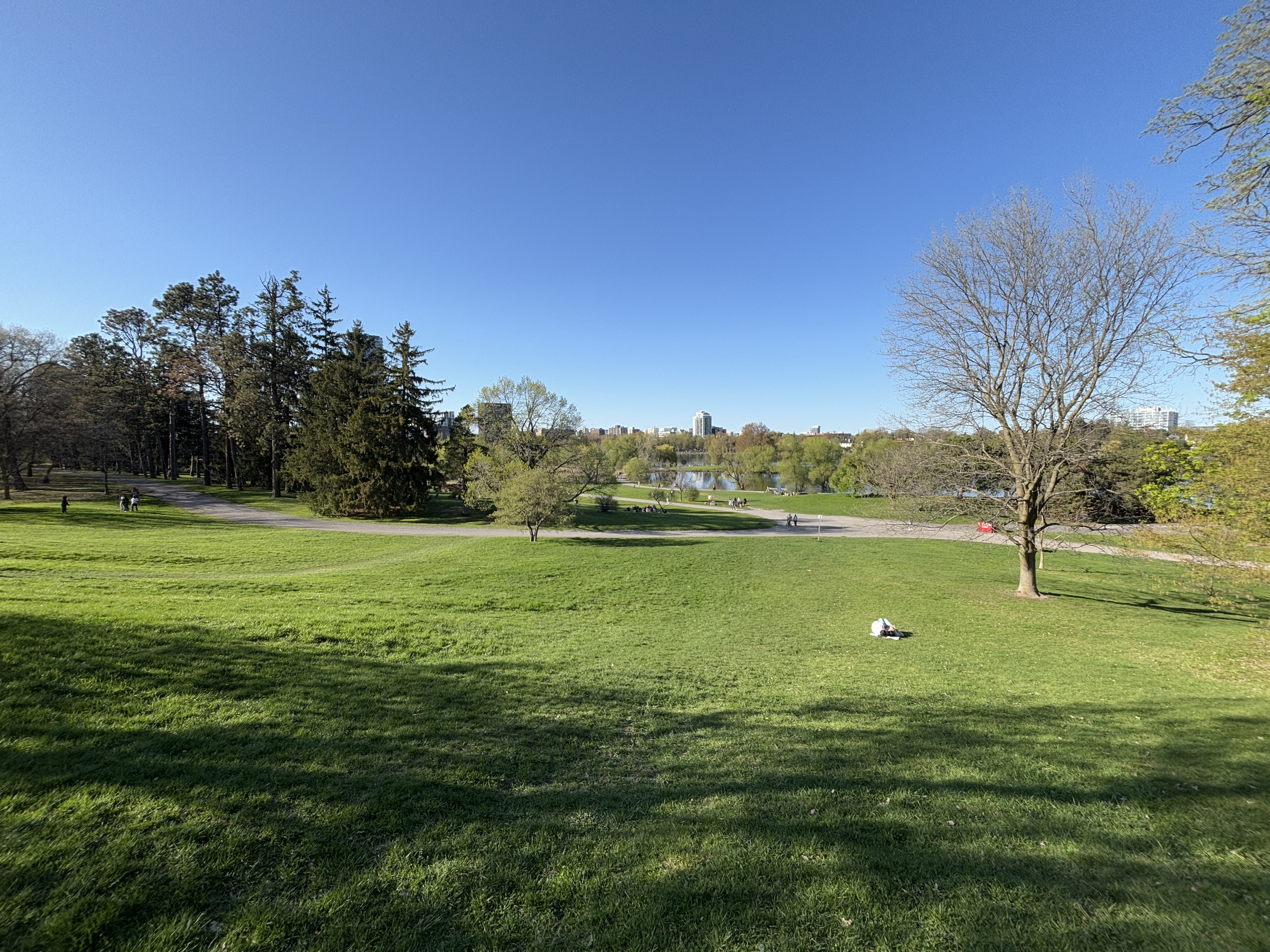
Dominion Arboretum

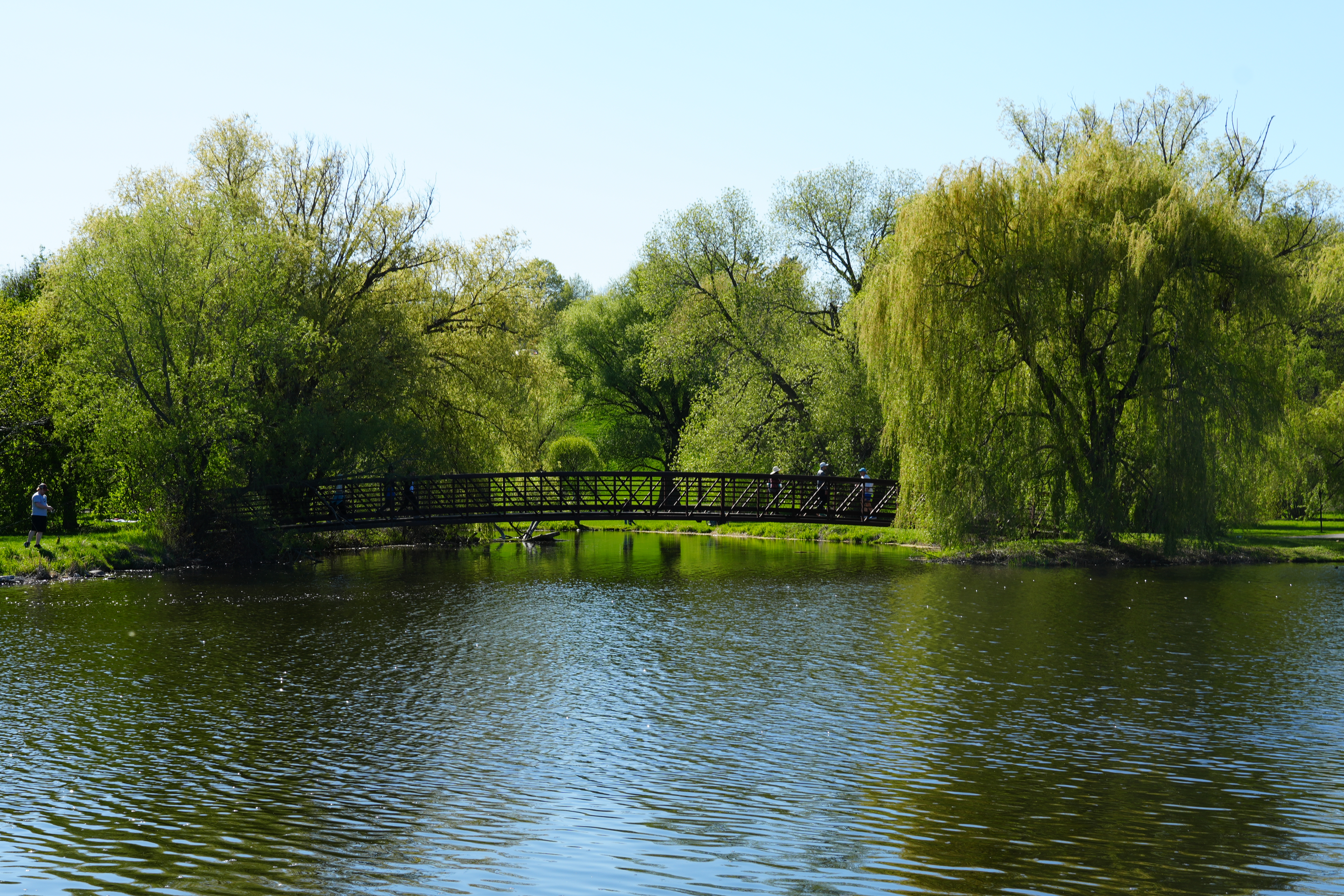
Heart Bridge at Dominion Arboretum

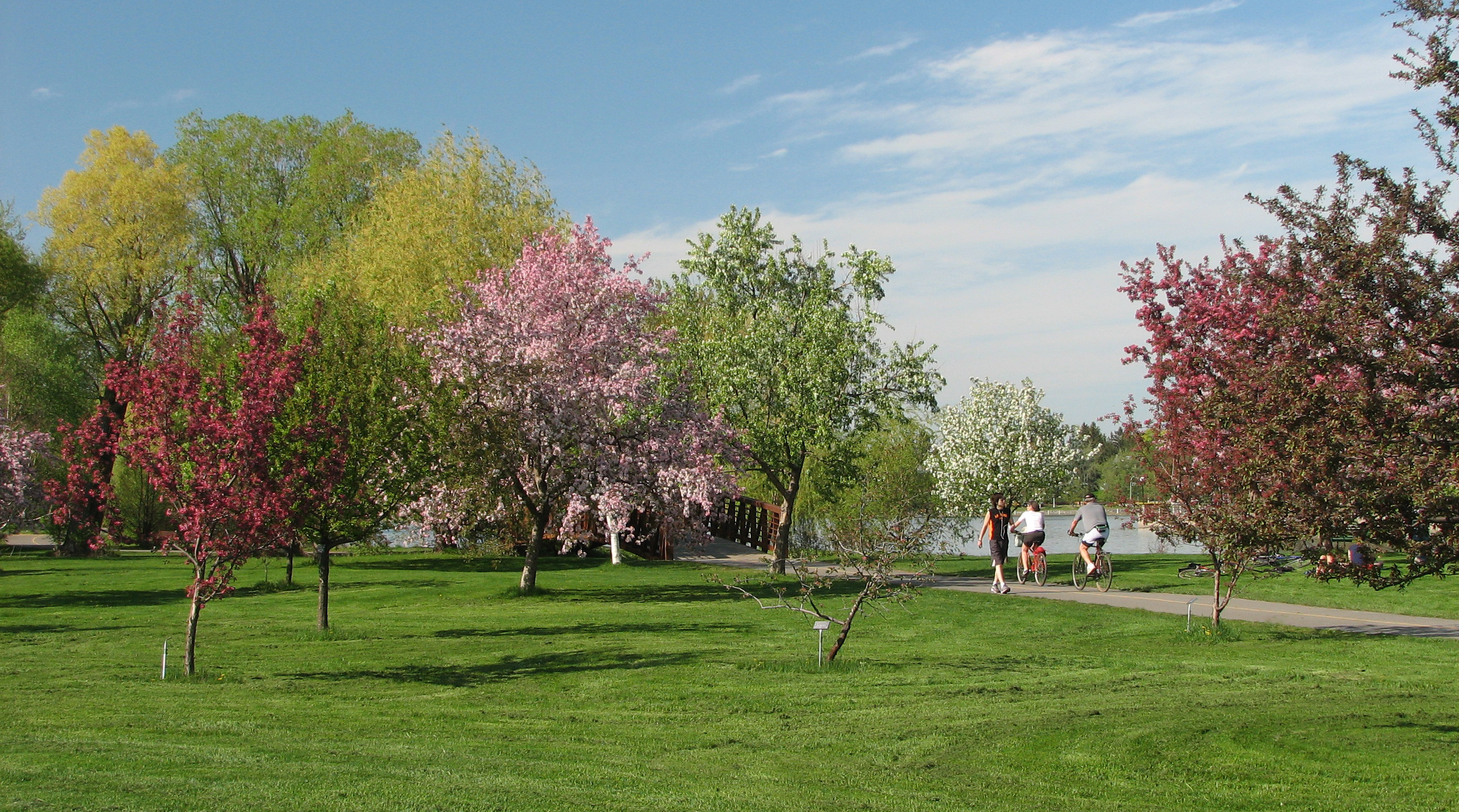
Arboretum's pathway along crabapple trees collection

The Dominion Arboretum (French: Arboretum du Dominion) is an arboretum part of the Central Experimental Farm of Agriculture and Agri-Food Canada in Ottawa, Ontario, Canada. Originally begun in 1889, the Arboretum covers about 26 hectares (64 acres) of rolling land between Prince of Wales Drive, Dow's Lake and the Rideau Canal. Carleton University is located at the opposite side of the Canal. At a latitude of 45°, it can experience extremely hot and humid summers and extremely cold winters.

It displays a wide range of well-established trees and shrubs with the intention of evaluating their hardiness, including 1,700 different species and varieties. The arboretum is open from dawn to dusk and the admission is free.

Although the climate of the Ottawa area is Zone 5a, the topography of the Arboretum produces a microclimate and is warmer by one zone. This has allowed for a collection of magnolias, azaleas, and several other fringe trees including Metasequoia and Liriodendron.

One of the favourite attractions for tourists is the Ornamental Gardens. In this area are located the annual plant display, perennial borders, lilac walks, roses and hedges. The hedge collection was planted between 1966 and 1968 and contains a variety of species suitable for use as a hedge.

== See also ==
- List of botanical gardens in Canada
- Central Experimental Farm
- Ornamental Gardens
