= Material Culture Review =

- Discipline: Anthropology
- Language: English
- Edited by: Ilaria Battiloro

Publication details
- Former name(s): Material History Review; Material History Bulletin
- History: 1976–present
- Publisher: Mount Allison University
- Frequency: Biannual

Standard abbreviations
- ISO 4: Mater. Cult. Rev.

Indexing
- ISSN: 1927-9264
- OCLC no.: 608083733

Links
- Journal homepage; Online access; Online archive

Material Culture Review (French: Revue de la culture matérielle) is a biannual peer-reviewed academic journal of material culture. It is abstracted and indexed in the MLA International Bibliography. The editor-in-chief is Ilaria Battiloro (Mount Allison University).

It was originally established as the Material History Bulletin in 1976 and renamed Material History Review in 1991. Former editor Gerald Pocius said that the journal was "largely the creation of historians, mostly working in museum contexts" at the National Museum of Man. In the mid-1980s, the journal was co-published by the National Museum of Science and Technology, which became the sole publisher in 1990. It became published by the University of Cape Breton in 2006, obtaining its current name. Since 2020 the journal is published by Mount Allison University.
