= National museums of Canada =

Museums operated by the Government of Canada

The Canadian Museum of History in Gatineau, Quebec.

Locations of the national museums of Canada

The national museums of Canada (French: musées nationaux du Canada) are the nine museums in Canada designated under the federal Museums Act and operated by the Government of Canada. The national museums are responsible for "preserving and promoting the heritage of Canada and all its peoples" and serving as "a source of inspiration, research, learning and entertainment... in both official languages."

There are many other museums owned and operated by the Canadian federal government that are not considered national museums. The Bank of Canada Museum in Ottawa, Correctional Service of Canada Museum in Kingston, and the National Historic Sites of Canada operated by Parks Canada across the country are all examples of museums administered by federal agencies but outside the national museums system.

== History ==
=== Origins ===
The concept of a "National Museum" in Canada had its beginnings on 16 May 1856, when the government of the Province of Canada authorized the Geological Survey of Canada to establish a Geological Museum in Montreal (then, the capital of the province). Once moved to Ottawa, the museum's scope gradually expanded; the National Museum of Canada was officially created from the Museum Branch of the federal Department of Mines on 5 January 1927.

=== National Museums of Canada Corporations ===
The National Museums of Canada Corporation (NMC) (French: Société des musées nationaux du Canada) was created in 1967. It included the National Gallery of Canada Corporation, the Canadian Museum of Civilization Corporation, the Canadian Museum of Nature Corporation, and the National Museum of Science and Technology Corporation (now the Canada Science and Technology Museum Corporation). The Canadian Conservation Institute, the Museum Assistance Program, The National Museum Library, and other miscellaneous museum and administrative offices were also under the NMC umbrella. The corporation was formalized under The National Museums Act which took effect on 1 April 1968. The NMC operated until 1988.

== List of museums ==
There are currently nine museums included in the national museums system. Of these nine, seven are located in the National Capital Region, one in Western Canada, and one in Atlantic Canada.

Four of the museums are incorporated as independent Crown corporations that report to Parliament through the Minister of Canadian Heritage. The Canadian Museum of History Corporation manages the Canadian War Museum and Canadian Museum of History. A sixth Crown corporation, Ingenium, manages the three museums focused on applied sciences: the Canada Agriculture and Food Museum, the Canada Aviation and Space Museum, and the Canada Science and Technology Museum.

In 2026, plans to designate the RCMP Heritage Centre as Canada's tenth national museum was announced, with formal designation pending legislative amendments.

Image	Museum	Location	Administering organization	Established	National museum status
	Canada Agriculture and Food Museum	Ottawa, Ontario	National Museum of Science and Technology	1983	1983
	Canada Aviation and Space Museum	Ottawa, Ontario	National Museum of Science and Technology	1960	1967 (Note: The following year was when the institution was brought under the administration of the National Museum of Canada.)
	Canada Science and Technology Museum	Ottawa, Ontario	National Museum of Science and Technology	1966 (Note: The institution traces its origins to the science and technology branch established by the National Museum of Canada in 1966.)	1966
	Canadian Museum of History	Gatineau, Quebec	Canadian Museum of History	1856 (Note: Both the Canadian Museum of History and the Canadian Museum of Nature traces its origins to the museum established by the Geological Survey of Canada in 1856.)	1927 (Note: The following year was when the museum was reorganized into the National Museum of Canada in 1927. In 1968, the National Museum was split into several institutions, including the National Museums of Man (now the Canadian Museum of History), Natural Sciences (now the Canadian Museum of Nature), and Science and Technology (now the Canada Science and Technology Museum).)
	Canadian Museum for Human Rights	Winnipeg, Manitoba	Independent federal Crown corporation	2014	2014
	Canadian Museum of Immigration at Pier 21	Halifax, Nova Scotia	Independent federal Crown corporation	1999	2011 (Note: The following year was when the institution was reorgnized into a federal Crown corporation.)
	Canadian Museum of Nature	Ottawa, Ontario	Independent Crown corporation	1856	1927
	Canadian War Museum	Ottawa, Ontario	Canadian Museum of History	1942	1958
	National Gallery of Canada	Ottawa, Ontario	Independent Crown corporation	1880	1880

== See also ==
- National Music Centre
- Canada's Sports Hall of Fame
- Tourism in Canada
- List of museums in Canada
- List of museums in Ottawa
- Provincial and territorial museums of Canada
- Canadian Museums Association
