= Ingenium =

Canada's Museums of Science and Innovation

Ingenium – Canada's Museums of Science and Innovation
- Formerly: Canada Science and Technology Museum Corporation
- Type: Crown corporation
- Founded: 1967; 59 years ago
- Headquarters: Ottawa, Ontario, Canada
- Key people: Christina Tessier, CEO
- Owner: Government of Canada
- Divisions: Canada Agriculture and Food Museum; Canada Aviation and Space Museum; Canada Science and Technology Museum
- Website: ingeniumcanada.org

Ingenium – Canada's Museums of Science and Innovation (French: Ingenium – Les musées des sciences et de l'innovation du Canada), formally the National Museum of Science and Technology (Musée national des sciences et de la technologie), (Note: The legal name of the institution is the National Museum of Science and Technology, with Ingenium – Canada's Museums of Science and Innovation used as the corporation's operational name since June 2017.) is a Canadian Crown corporation responsible for overseeing national museums related to science and technology. The name is based on the Latin root of the word ingenuity. Until June 2017, the corporation was branded as Canada Science and Technology Museum Corporation (Société du Musée des sciences et de la technologie du Canada).

The corporation oversees the Canada Agriculture and Food Museum, the Canada Aviation and Space Museum and the Canada Science and Technology Museum. The organization is headquartered in Ottawa, Ontario.

The corporation's museums are associated with the Canadian Museum Association, the Virtual Museum of Canada and the Canadian Heritage Information Network. Ingenium has an open documents portal where the corporation shares working documents and corporate plans. It also maintains an open data portal.

== Ingenium Centre ==
In 2016, the Government of Canada announced $150 million in funding to build the Ingenium Centre. This state-of-the-art facility is designed to protect and showcase Canada's national science and technology collection of 85,000 artifacts and nearly two million 2D artifacts.

Construction started in 2017. The completed building is 36,000 m^{2} and almost 10 storeys high. The library, archives, conservation labs, workshops and staff moved in 2019 and early 2020. The artifact move was expected to last through 2021.

== History ==
Ingenium was established through an act of Parliament (the Museums Act) on July 1, 1990, and is governed by a board of trustees headed by a president and chief executive officer. The museum's reconstruction, "digital strategy" and change of name were documented in the TVOntario film "How to build a museum for the 21st century", broadcast in December 2018.

Since 2007, Ingenium is supported by the Ingenium Foundation. The foundation achieved official charity status on April 1, 2008.

In 2014, the Canada Science and Technology Museum was forced to close because of toxic mould pollution. Three years into the renovation, in 2017, the three museums under the Canada Science and Technology Museum Corporation, the museum's CEO Alex Benay announced the rebranding of the network to Ingenium.

In September 2018, the Canada Science and Technology Museum stopped collecting artifacts for the foreseeable future.

== Exhibits ==
Exhibits are housed in the Canada Agriculture and Food Museum, the Canada Aviation and Space Museum and the Canada Science and Technology Museum, all located across Ottawa, Ontario. Together, the three museums under the corporation feature twenty long-term exhibitions:

- Artifact Alley - Artifact Alley is the main hall at the Canada Science and Technology Museum. The hall displays more than 700 artifacts, some of which are interactive.
- Canola! Seeds of Innovation - An exhibition at the Canada Agriculture and Food Museum, created to celebrate the 50th anniversary of the creation of canola, in collaboration with the Canola Initiative National Advisory Committee. (CINAC)
- Crazy Kitchen + - The oldest exhibition in the collection, it dates back to 1967 when the Canada Science and Technology Museum opened to display optical illusions.
- Discovery Park - Outdoor Exhibition - An exhibition on renewable energy and technologies at the Canada Agriculture and Food Museum.
- Engines: Power to Fly - Showcases the Canada Aviation and Space Museum's collection of airplane engines.
- Food Preservation: The Science You Eat - Explores the science of food preservation at the Canada Agriculture and Food Museum.
- From Earth to Us - Explores how natural resources are transformed at the Canada Science and Technology Museum.
- Hidden Worlds - Displays technologies at the Canada Science and Technology Museum that have helped humanity study our world, such as microscopes and telescopes.
- Life in Orbit: The International Space Station - On view at the Canada Aviation and Space Museum and developed with the Canadian Space Agency, giving visitors an opportunity to learn about life in Space.
- Main Exhibition Hall - The main hall at the Canada Aviation and Space Museum.
- Medical Sensations - Explores the world of medical innovation and technology in Canada, at the Canada Science and Technology Museum.
- Sound by Design - On view at the Canada Science and Technology Museum; showcases the changes in sound technology that have occurred over the past 150 years.
- Steam: A World in Motion - An exhibition at the Canada Science and Technology Museum about steam transportation, and how it ruled Canada from 1900 to 1960.
- Technology in our Lives - Explores the relationship between household technologies and Canadians since the Second World War at the Canada Science and Technology Museum. It also features a tiny house.
- Wearable Tech - On view at the Canada Science and Technology Museum; explores technologies that have been designed for the human body since the 1800s.
- ZOOOM - Children's Innovation Zone - A hands-on children's exhibition at the Canada Science and Technology Museum.
- Into the Great Outdoors - Examines the technologies used by Canadians to explore the outdoors, at the Canada Science and Technology Museum.
- Canada in Space - The newest permanent exhibition at the Canada Aviation and Space Museum about Canada's achievements in Space.
- Health in Space: Daring to Explore - On view at the Canada Aviation and Space Museum; looks at work done by Canadians to improve understanding of health in Space.

Each museum also hosts temporary exhibitions.
