= Canada Aviation and Space Museum =

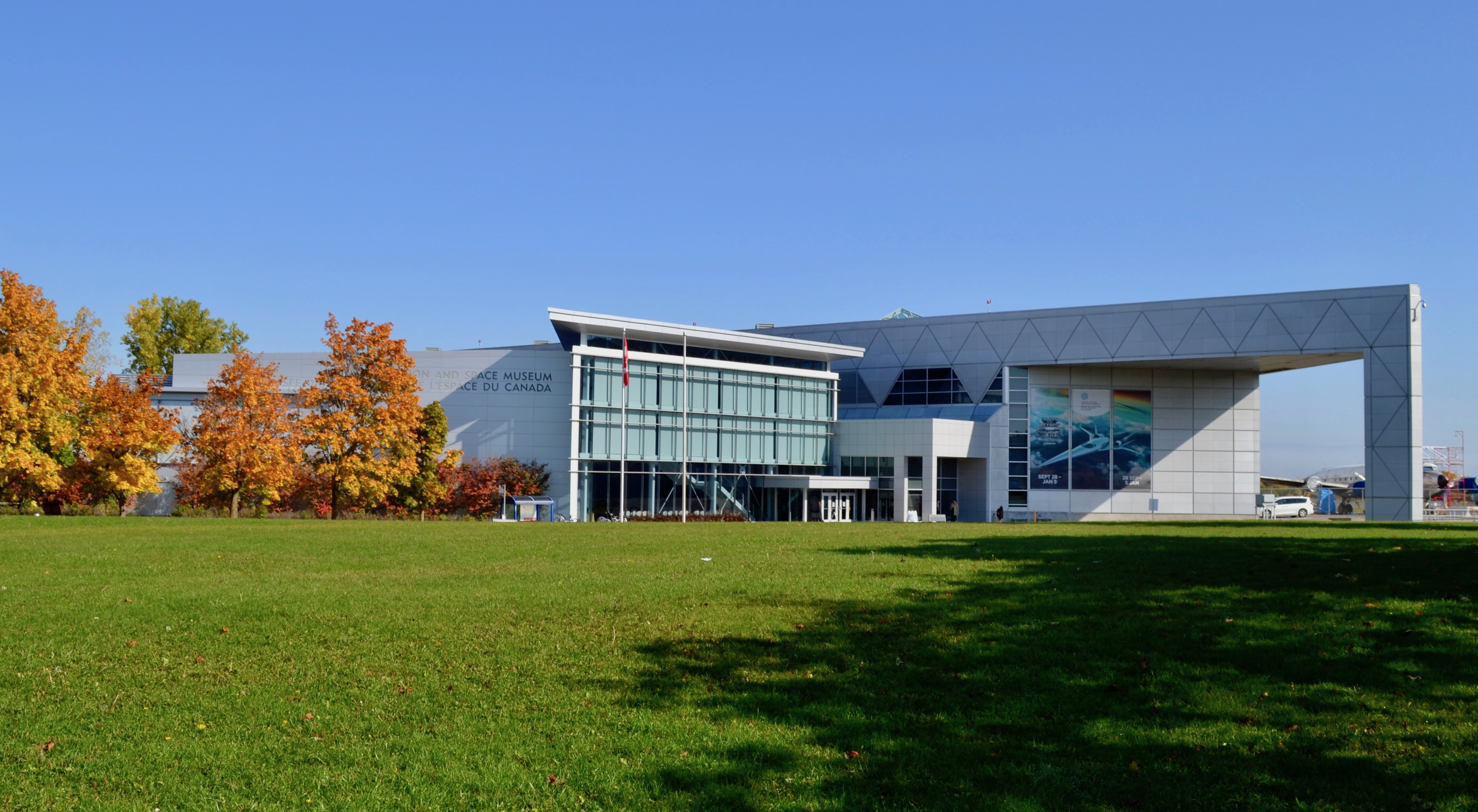
- The exterior of the Aviation and Space Museum
- Former name: National Aviation Museum
- Established: 1960
- Location: Ottawa, Ontario, Canada, at the Ottawa/Rockcliffe Airport
- Coordinates: 45.457723°N 75.642929°W
- Type: Aviation museum
- Website: ingeniumcanada.org/aviation

Ingenium
- Canada Agriculture and Food Museum; Canada Aviation and Space Museum; Canada Science and Technology Museum

The Canada Aviation and Space Museum (French: Musée de l'Aviation et de l'Espace du Canada) (formerly the Canada Aviation Museum (Musée de l'aviation du Canada) and National Aeronautical Collection (Collection aéronautique nationale)) is Canada's national aviation history museum. The museum is located in Ottawa, Ontario, Canada, at Ottawa/Rockcliffe Airport.

== History ==
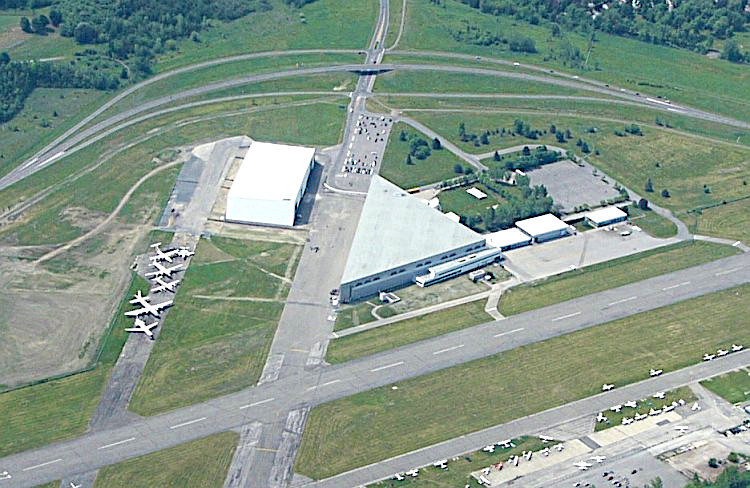
Aerial view of the Canada Aviation Museum as it was then known, on 5 June 2005. The triangular structure is the main museum building. The rectangular white building to the left of it is the new museum storage building opened 14 April 2005.

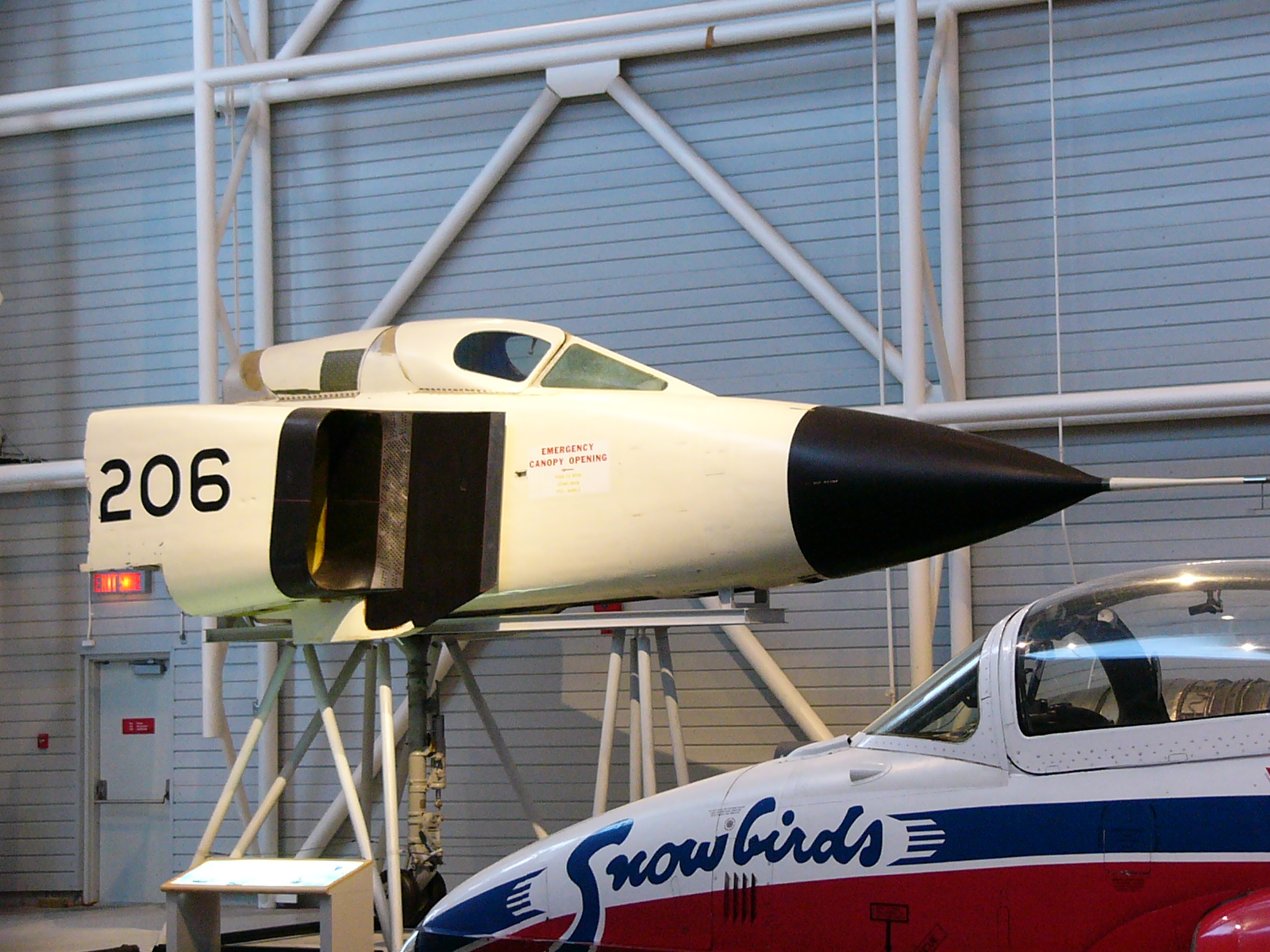
Nose section of Avro Arrow RL 206

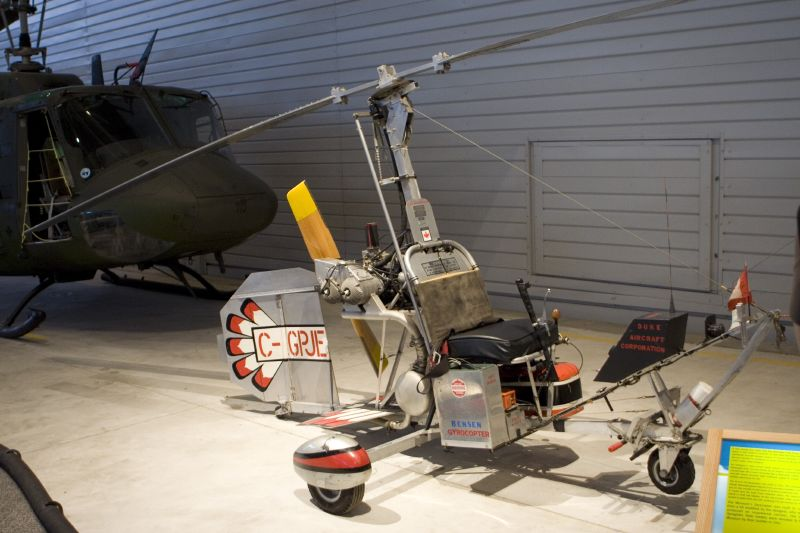
Bensen B-8

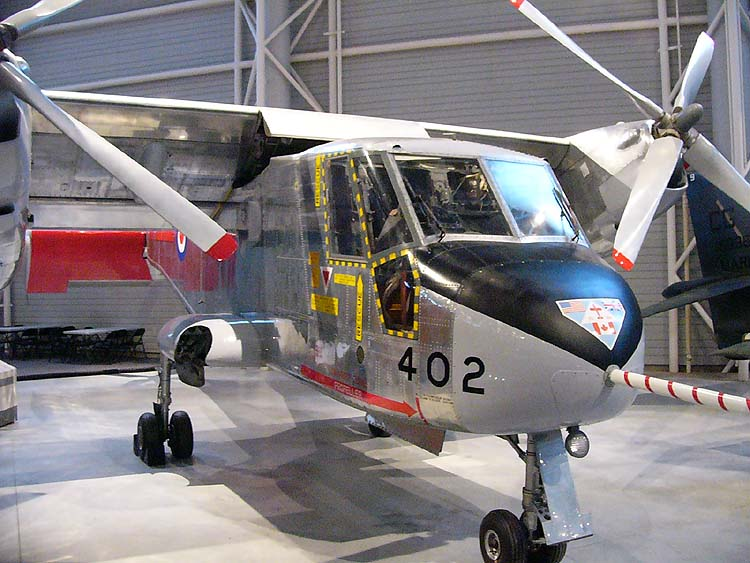
Canadair CL-84 Dynavert prototype

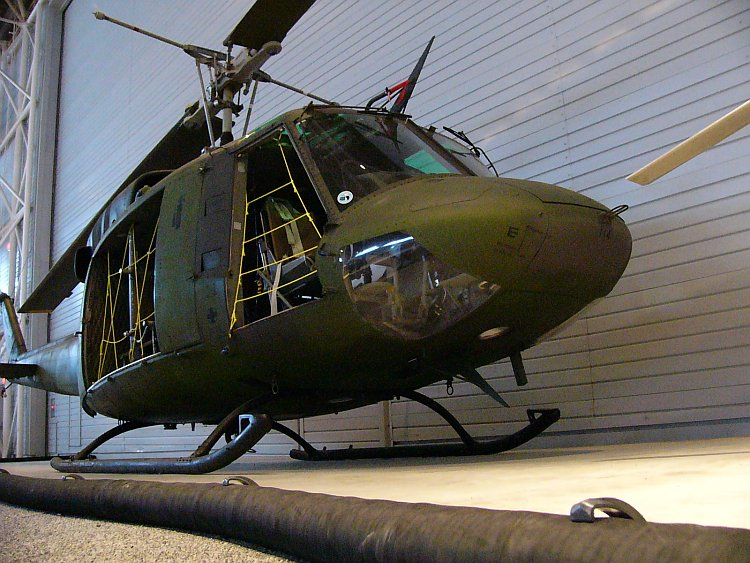
Bell CH-135 Twin Huey serial number 135114

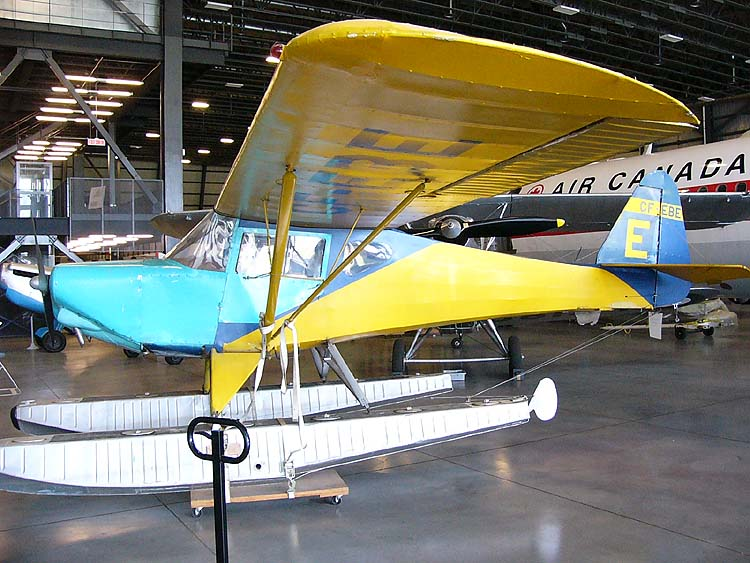
Fleet Canuck serial number 149, in the museum's storage building

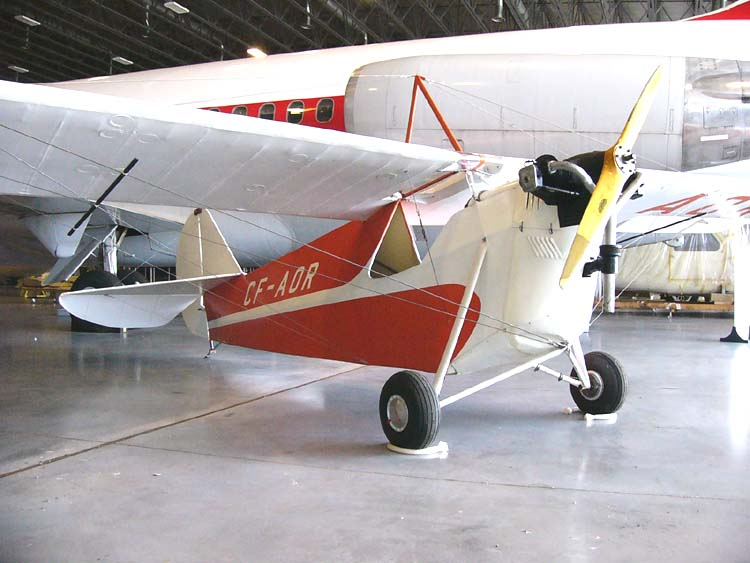
Aeronca C-2 CF-AOR, in the museum's storage building

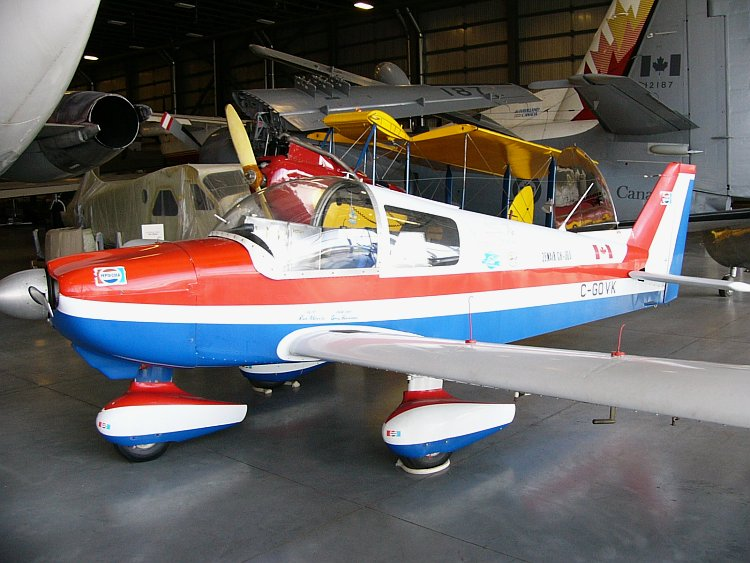
Zenair CH 300 Tri Zenith C-GOVK used by Red Morris to make a record-setting non-stop flight across Canada in 1978. The aircraft is in the museum's storage building

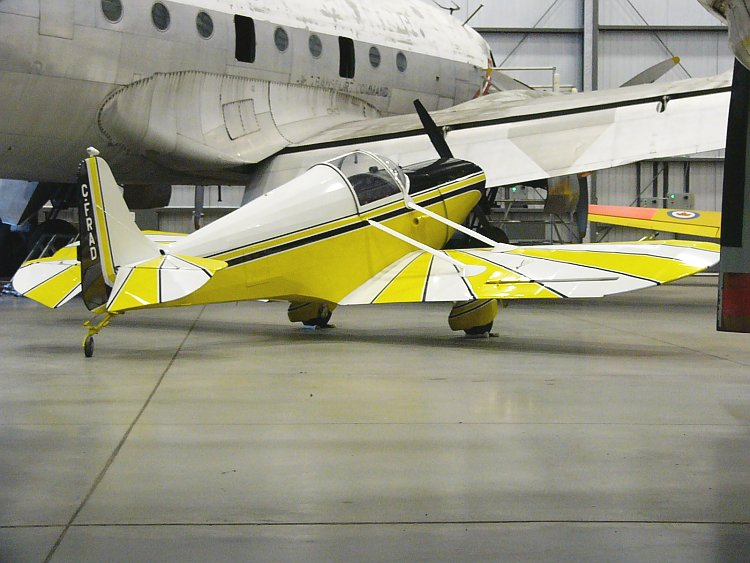
Canada's first amateur-built aircraft, Stitts SA-3A Playboy CF-RAD, in the museum's storage building

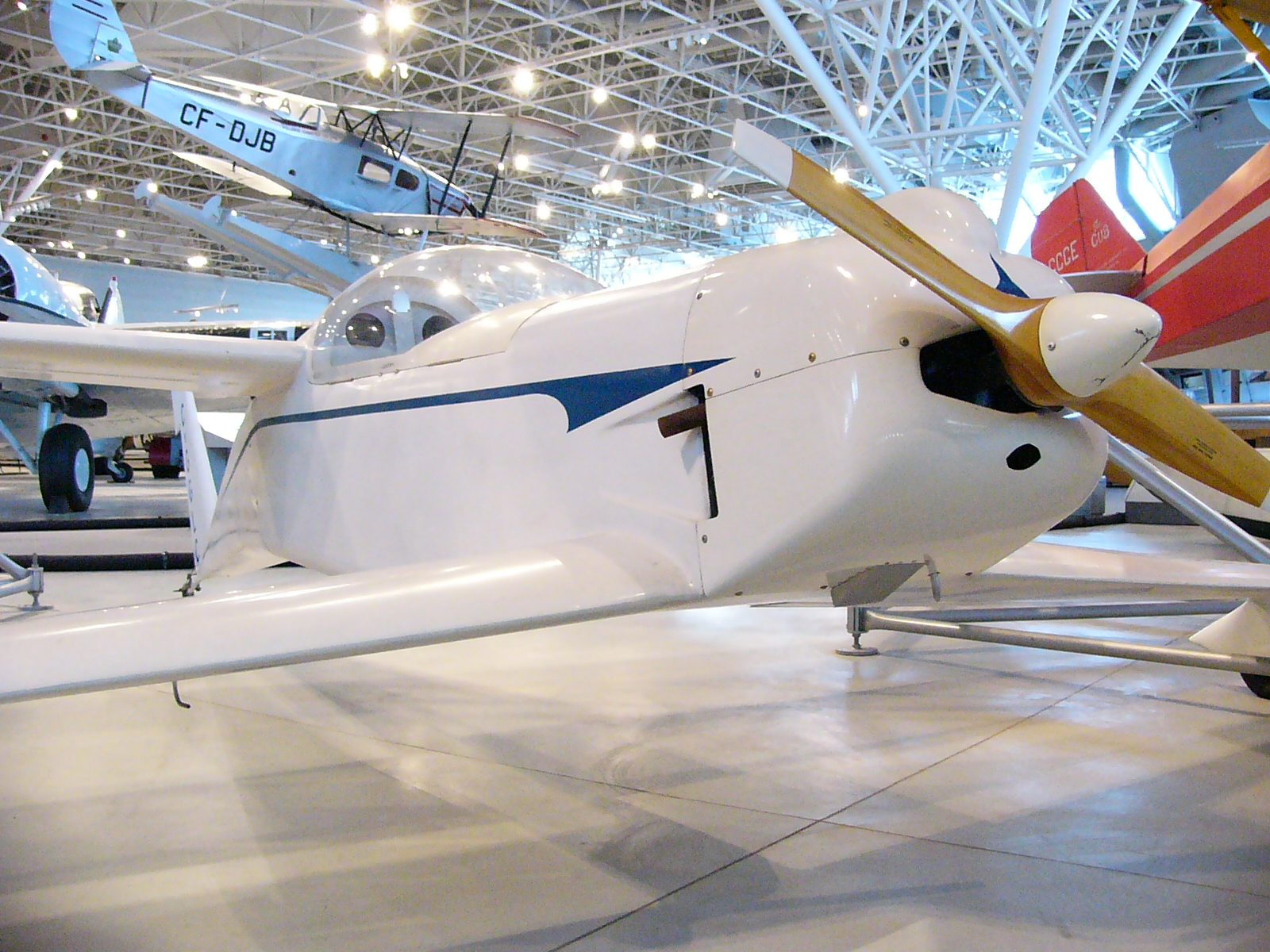
An original single-seat Rutan Quickie powered by an Orion 18 hp (14 kW) industrial motor. This aircraft is in the museum's storage hangar.

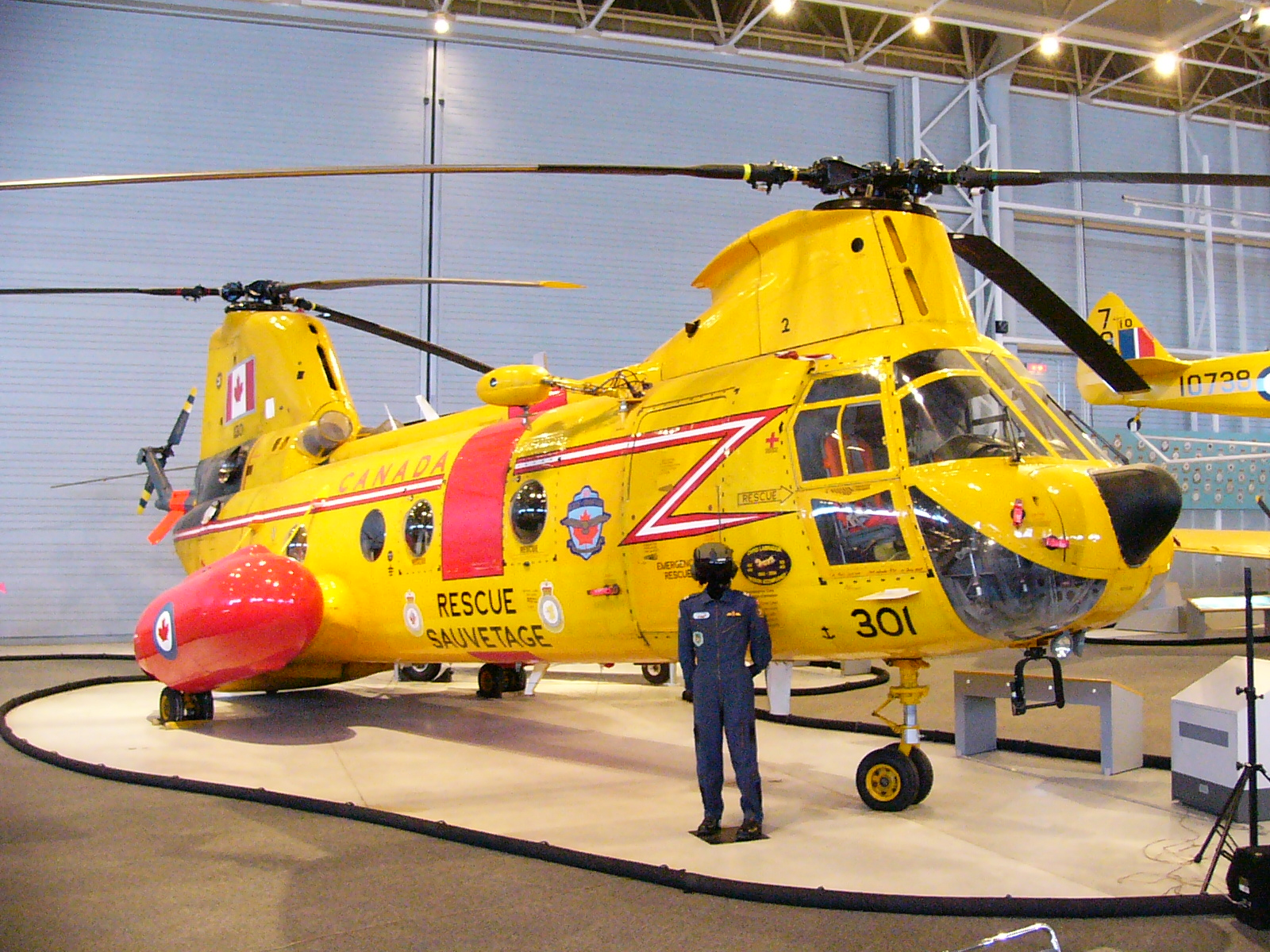
CH-113 Labrador helicopter in the main wing of the museum

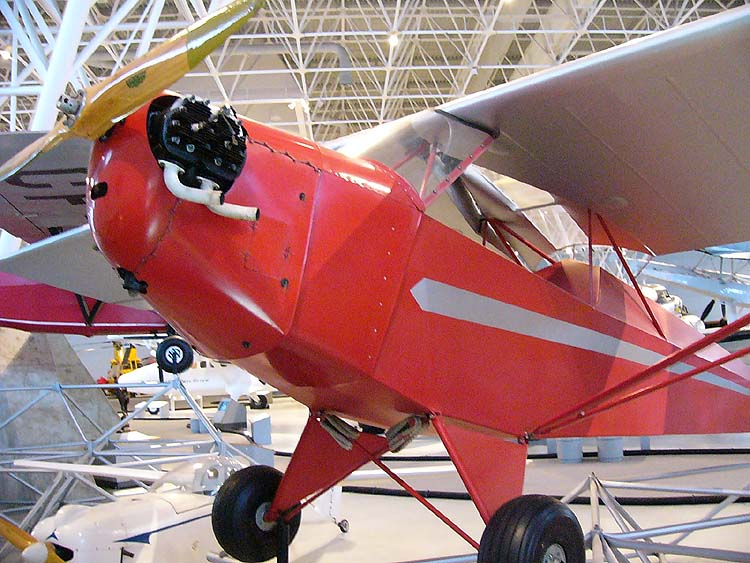
Taylor E-2 Cub showing its Continental A-40 engine with the cylinders protruding through the cowling.

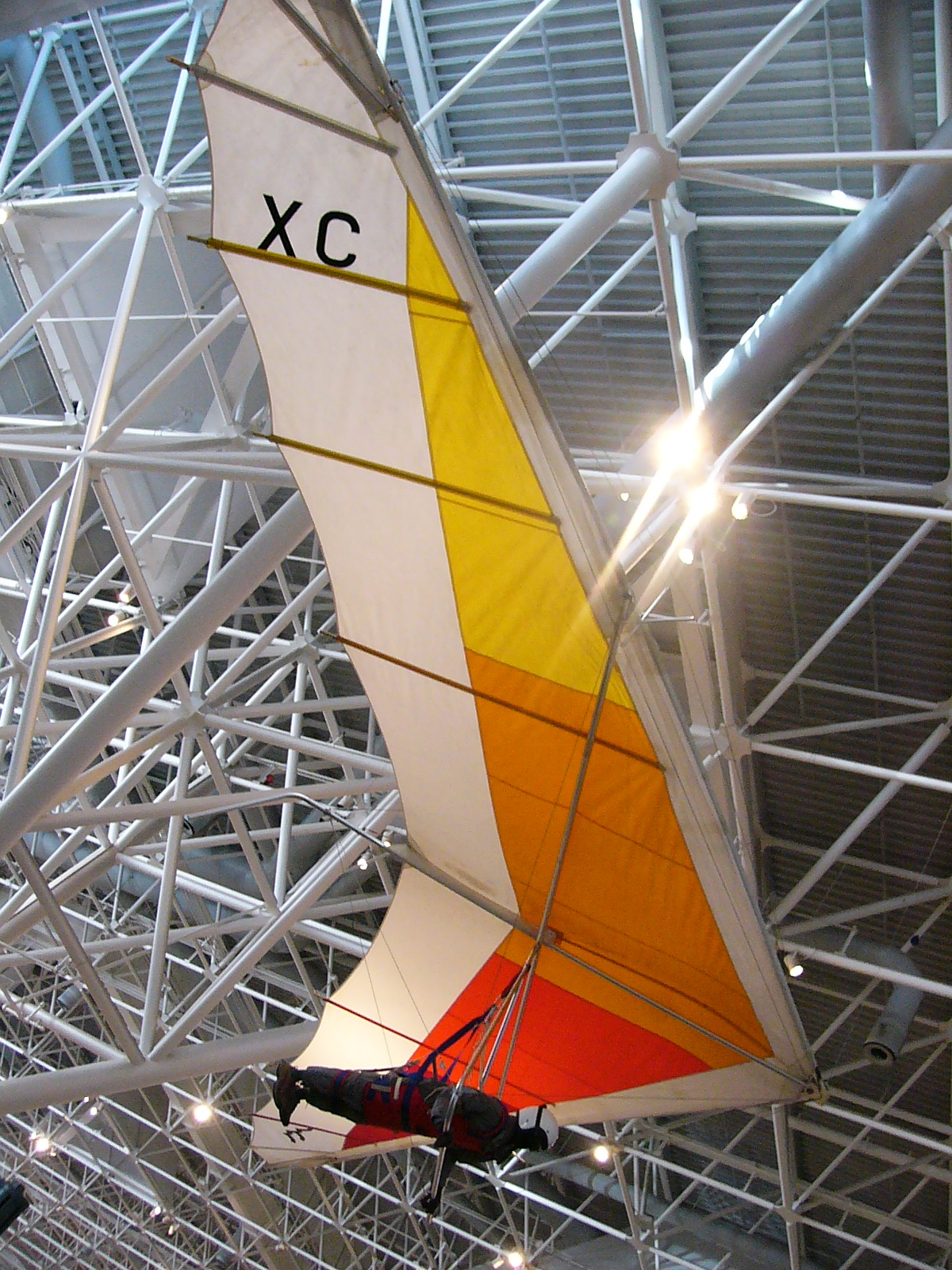
Wills Wing XC-185 at the Canada Aviation and Space Museum

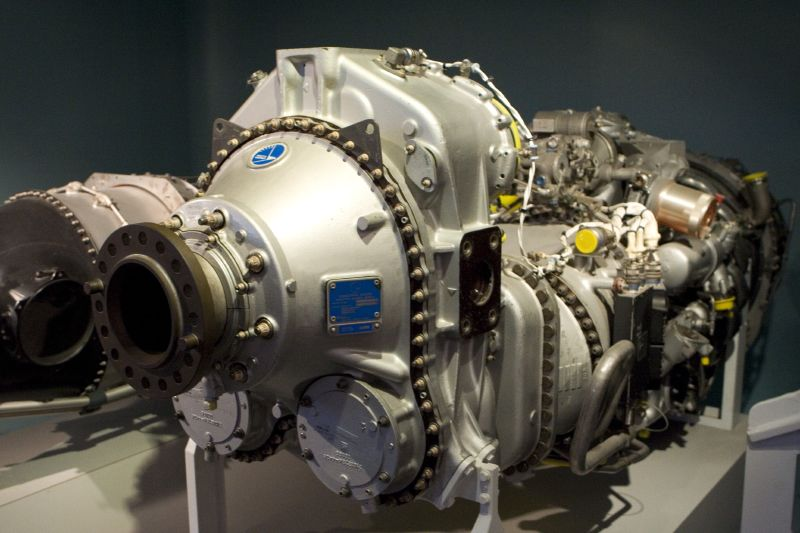
PW120 at Canada Aviation and Space Museum

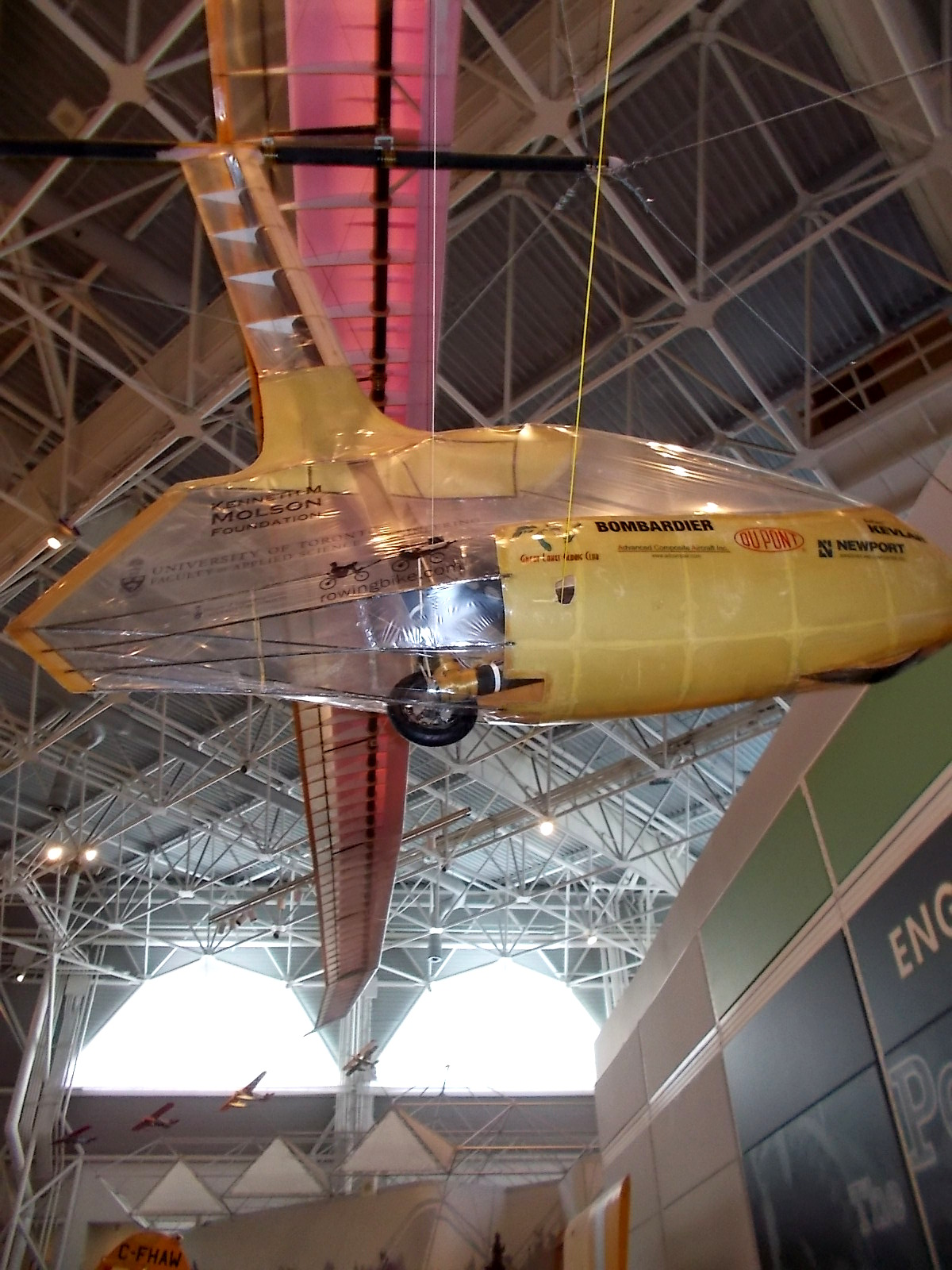
UTIAS Snowbird ornithopter

The museum was first formed in 1960 as the National Aviation Museum. In 1964, its collection was consolidated with the Canadian War Museum and Royal Canadian Air Force's historic collection at RCAF Station Rockcliffe, which became the National Aeronautical Collection. These included the National Aviation Museum at Uplands, which concentrated on early aviation and bush flying; the Canadian War Museum collection, which concentrated on military aircraft, and which included many war trophies, some dating back to World War One, and the RCAF Museum which focused on those aircraft operated by the Royal Canadian Air Force.

In 1982 the collection was renamed the National Aviation Museum and in 1988 the collection was moved to a new experimental type triangular hangar from the Second World War-era wooden hangars it had been residing in. In 2006 an additional hangar was opened, which allows all of the collection's aircraft to be stored indoors.

The museum closed 2 September 2008 for remodeling and rearrangement of the aircraft on display. This project was completed and the museum reopened 19 November 2008. The changes made include making space for a new exhibition entitled Canadian Wings: A Remarkable Century of Flight that was unveiled on 23 February 2009, the centennial of the first heavier than air aircraft flight in Canada.

In December 2008, the museum announced that approval had been granted for a C$7M expansion to begin in May 2009 and to be completed by the fall of 2010. The improvements carried out included an addition of 2600 m^{2} (28,000 ft²) giving 18% more space and providing room for a new foyer, auditorium, cafeteria, retail space, a landscaped entrance and classrooms.

In April 2010, the parent Canada Science and Technology Museum Corporation announced that the museum would be expanded and that its name would be changed to the "Canada Aviation and Space Museum" in May 2010. The Canadian Press expressed concern that the name change would cause confusion with the existing Toronto-based Canadian Air and Space Museum.

== Organization ==
The Canada Aviation and Space Museum is under the control of Ingenium, previously known as the Canadian Science and Technology Museums Corporation. Ingenium is an autonomous Crown corporation which works to preserve and protect Canada's scientific and technical heritage. The corporation is responsible for three museums: the Canada Aviation and Space Museum, the Canada Agriculture Museum and the Canada Science and Technology Museum.

The museum is also home to 51 Canada Aviation Museum Squadron, Royal Canadian Air Cadets.

== Collection ==
The museum's collection contains a wide variety of civilian and military aircraft, representing the history of Canadian aviation from the pioneer era before the First World War up to the present day. Particularly noteworthy is the collection of vintage bushplanes from the 1920s to the 1940s. The military aircraft represent aircraft flown by Canadians in the First World War, Second World War, and the Cold War. The museum's best known exhibit is the surviving components of the Avro Arrow interceptor from the late 1950s.

Also at the museum is Space Shuttle Endeavour's Canadarm, the Space Shuttles' Canadian-built robotic arm. It was unveiled on 2 May 2013 with Chris Hadfield on hand from the International Space Station via video screen to aid with the unveiling. While Endeavour's Canadarm, officially known as Canadarm 201, was moved back to Canada, Atlantis's and Discovery's Canadarms went to the museums of their respective Shuttles.

Also on site are interactive activities on the science of flight, films, demonstrations, a boutique, and guided tours.

A few of the tours take the visitors "behind the scenes" to see conservation and restoration work in progress, and components which are in storage.

=== Aircraft in collection ===
Aircraft type	Serial number	Registration/markings
Aerial Experiment Association Silver Dart (replica)	2	none
Aeronca C-2	9	CF-AOR
AEG G.IV	unknown	574/18
Airspeed Consul	4338	G-AIKR
Auster AOP.6	TAY221V/16652	VF582
Avro 504K	unknown	G-CYCK
Avro 504K	2353	G-CYFG
Avro 616IVM Avian	R3/CN/314	CF-CDQ
Avro 652A Mk.V-P Anson	MDF 329	RCAF 12518
Avro 683X Lancaster Mk.X (nose only)	unknown	KB848
Avro 683X Lancaster Mk.X	C/N 37245	KB944/NA-P
Avro Canada CF-100 Mk.5 Canuck	657	CAF 100757
Avro Canada CF-100 Mk.5 Canuck	685	CAF 100785
Avro Canada C-102 Jetliner (nose only)	unknown	CF-EJD-X
Avro Canada CF-105 Arrow (nose, outer wings and rudder)	206, 203	RCAF 25206, 25203
Bellanca CH-300 Pacemaker	181	CF-ATN
Bell CH-135 Twin Huey	32014	CAF 135114
Bell HTL-6	1387	RCN 1387
Bensen B-8 Gyroglider	unknown	C-GSXV
Bensen B-8MG Gyrocopter	P-6174	C-GPJE
Blériot XI	unknown	none
Boeing 247D	1699	CF-JRQ
Boeing CIM-10B Bomarc	656	RCAF 60446
Boeing Vertol CH-113 Labrador	301	CAF 11301
Morane-Borel monoplane	unknown	none
Bristol Beaufighter T.F.X/TT.X	unknown	RD867
Bristol 149 Bolingbroke Mk.IV.T	unknown	RCAF 9892
Bristol F.2B Fighter	67626	D7889
Buzzman Buccaneer SX	9112-SX-AA	C-IDWT
Canadair CL-4 North Star Mk.1	122	RCAF 17515
Canadair CL-13 Sabre Mk.6	1245	RCAF 23455
Canadair CL-13 Sabre Mk.6	1441	RCAF 23651
Canadair CL-30 CT-133 Silver Star Mk.3	T-33-574	RCAF 21574
Canadair CL-28 CP-107 Argus Mk.2	33	CAF 10742
Canadair CL-41 CT-114 Tutor	1108	CAF 114108
Canadair CL-84-1 Dynavert	3	CX8402
Canadair CL-219 CF-116A (CF-5A)	1063	CAF 116763
Canadair CL-604 Challenger 604	3991	C-GCGT
Canadian-Vickers Canso A	CV423	RCAF 11087
Cessna 150H	15068295	C-GAZG
Cessna Crane (T-50)	2226	RCAF 8676
Consolidated Liberator B.VIII	44-50154 c/n: 5009	KN820
Curtiss HS-2L	2901-H.2	G-CAAC
Curtiss JN.4C Canuck	unknown	C227
Curtiss Hawk 87A-3 Kittyhawk Mk.Ia	AL135 c/n:18780	RCAF 1076
Czerwiński-Shenstone Harbinger	C-1	C-FZCS
de Havilland Canada CC-115 Buffalo	unknown	RCAF 115452
de Havilland Canada DHC-1B-2-S5 Chipmunk Mk.2	208–246	RCAF 12070
de Havilland Canada DHC-2 Beaver I	1	CF-FHB
de Havilland Canada DHC-3 Otter	370	CAF 1239408
de Havilland Canada DHC-6 Twin Otter	1	CF-DHC-X
de Havilland Canada DHC-7 Dash 7	1	C-GNBX
de Havilland D.H.60X Moth	630	G-CAUA
de Havilland D.H.80A Puss Moth	2187	CF-PEI
de Havilland D.H.82C2 Menasco Moth	DHC1052	RCAF 4861
de Havilland D.H.82C Tiger Moth	DHC724	CF-FGL
de Havilland D.H.83C Fox Moth	FM-28/2	CF-DJB
de Havilland D.H.98B Mosquito Mk.XX	unknown	KB336
de Havilland D.H.100 Vampire Mk.I	unknown	TG372
de Havilland D.H.100 Vampire Mk.3	EEP 42392	RCAF 17074
Douglas DC-3C Dakota	6261	C-FTDJ
Epervier Epervier X1	EP-01	C-FWMQ
Evans VP-1 Volksplane	unknown	C-GUPY
Fairchild 82A	61	CF-AXL
Fairchild FC-2W2	128	G-CART
Fairchild Cornell III	FC 239	RCAF 10738
Fairey Battle Mk.I.T	61	R7384
Fairey Firefly FR.I	F.7776 GAL F.8/12794	DK545
Fairey Swordfish Mk.III	unknown	NS122/TH-M (fictitious)
Fleet Model 16B Finch II	408	RCAF 4510
Fleet Model 50 Freighter (in storage)	202	CF-BXP
Fleet Model 80 Canuck	149	CF-EBE
Fokker D.VII	D.VII 3659	10347/18
Found FBA-2C	4	CF-OZV
Fulton FA-3 Airphibian	1	N74154
Grumman CP-121 Tracker	DHC-86	CAF 12187
Grumman Goose Mk.II	B 77	CF-MPG
Hawker Afghan Hind	41H/82970	L7180
Hawker Hurricane Mk.XII	52019	RCAF 5584
Hawker Sea Fury FB.11	41H/609977	RCN TG119
Heinkel He 162A-1	unknown	120086
Hispano HA-1112-M1L	164	471-39/C.4K-114
Junkers J.I	252	586/18
Junkers W.34F/Fi	2718	CF-ATF
Lockheed F-104 Starfighter	183-1058	RCAF 12700
Lockheed Model 10A Electra	1112	CF-TCA
Lockheed Model 12A Electra Junior	1219	CF-CCT
Lockheed Jetstar 6	5018	C-FDTX
Maurice Farman M.F.11 Shorthorn	1505	VH-UBC
McDonnell CF-101B Voodoo	518	CAF 101025
McDonnell Banshee	174	RCN 126464
McDonnell-Douglas CF-188	47	CAF 188901
McDonnell Douglas DC-9-32	47021	CF-TLL
McDowall Monoplane	none	none
Messerschmitt Bf 109F-4	10132	n/a
Me 163B-1a Komet	191916	26
Nieuport 12 A.2	N1504	N1504
Nieuport 17 C.1 (replica) (Note: On display at Canadian War Museum)	unknown	B1566
Noorduyn Norseman Mk.VI	136	RCAF 787
North American Harvard Mk.II	66-2265	RCAF 2532
North American Harvard Mk.II	81-4107	RCAF 3840
North American Harvard Mk.IV	CCF4-178	RCAF 20387
North American Mustang Mk.IV	122-39806	RCAF 9298
North American Mitchell Mk.III	44-86699 c/n: 108-47453	RCAF 5244
Northrop Delta Mk.I/IA (in storage)	CV 183	RCAF 673
Piasecki HUP-3	52	RCN 51-16623
Pitcairn-Cierva PCA-2 Autogyro	8	NC2524
Pitts S-2A Special	2059	C-FAMR
Royal Aircraft Factory B.E.2c	B & C 1042	RFC 5878
Rutan Quickie	1001	C-GGLC
S.C.A.N. 30 (Grumman Widgeon)	28	CF-ODR
Sikorsky HO3S-1 Dragonfly	5118	RCN 9601
Sikorsky HO4S-3G	555877	RCN 55877
Sikorsky R-4B Hoverfly	102	43-46565
Sopwith 2F.1 Camel	unknown	N8156
Sopwith 7F.1 Snipe	unknown	E6938
Sopwith Pup (replica)	C552	B2167
Sopwith Triplane (replica)	ET-1	N5492/CF-CBM
Spectrum RX-550SB Beaver	SB2331	C-IGOW
Stearman 4EM Junior Speedmail	4021	CF-AMB
Stinson SR Reliant	8717	CF-HAW
Stits SA-3A Playboy	5501	C-FRAD
Supermarine Spitfire Mk.IIB	CBAF 711	P8332
Supermarine Spitfire LF Mk.IX	CBAF IX 2161	NH188
Supermarine Spitfire Mk.XVIe	CBAF IX 4424	TE214
Taylorcraft BC-65	1409	CF-BPR
Taylor E-2 Cub	289	C-GCGE
Travel Air 2000	720	CF-AFG
Vickers Viscount 757	270	CF-THI
Waco GXE	1521	C-GAFD
Waco VKS-7	6117	C-FLWL
Westland Lysander Mk.IIIA	1216	R9003
Wills Wing XC-185	unknown	none
WSK LIM-2 (MiG-15)	1 B 003-16	316
Zenair CH 300 Tri-Zenith	300	C-GOVK

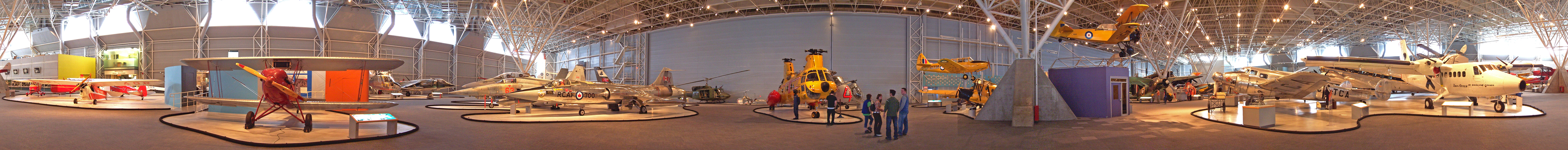
360° Panorama

== Affiliations ==
The museum is affiliated with: CMA, CHIN, and Virtual Museum of Canada.

== See also ==
- Canada Science and Technology Museum Corporation
- History of aviation in Canada
- List of aerospace museums
- Military history of Canada
- Organization of Military Museums of Canada

== Bibliography ==
- McCaffery, Dan (2000), Canada's Warplanes: Unique Aircraft in Canada's Aviation Museums, J. Lorimer, ISBN 1-55028-699-4
