= Canada Agriculture and Food Museum =

- Musée de l'agriculture et de l'alimentation du Canada
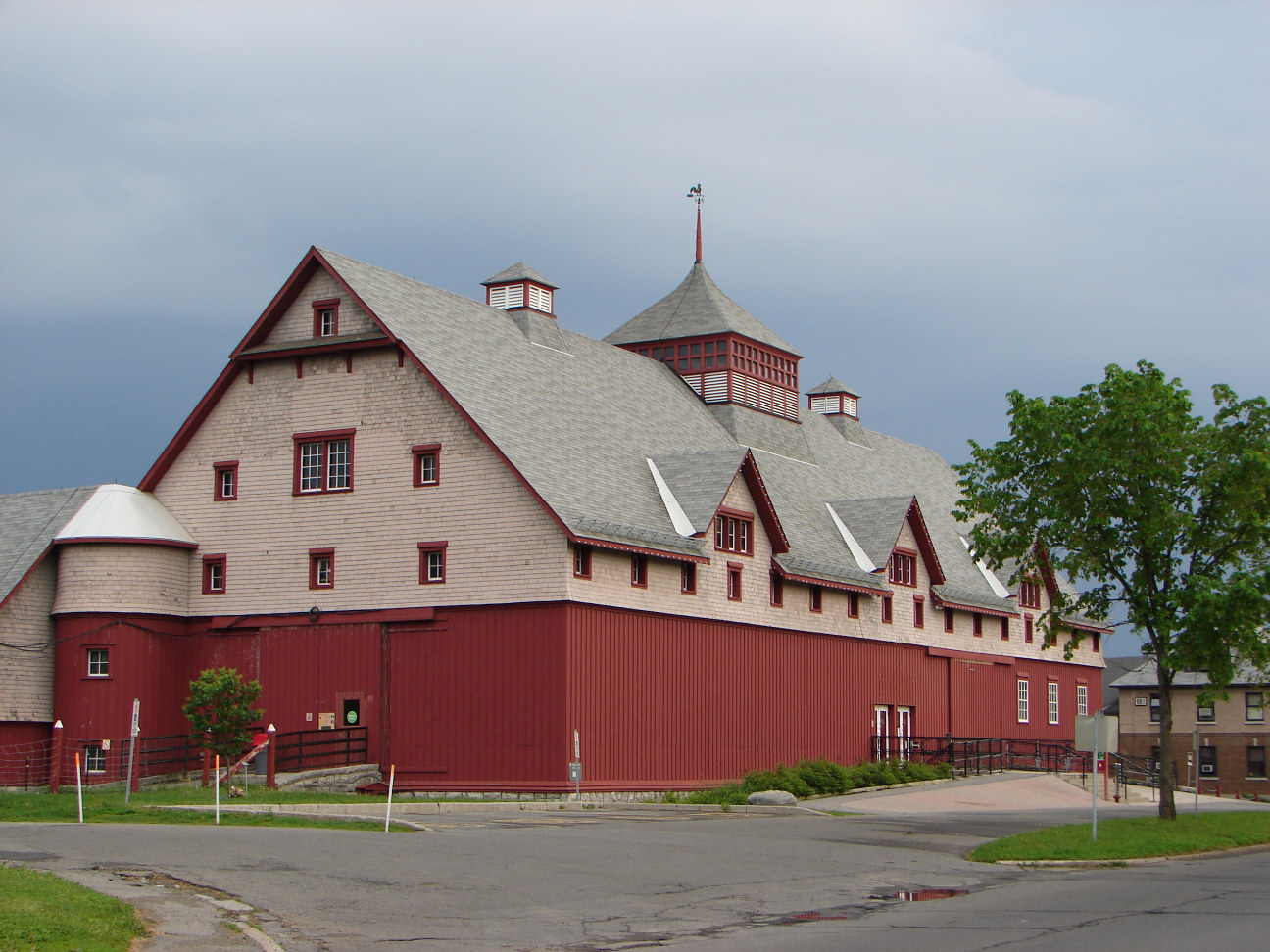
- Exterior of museum's main building, "Building 88"
- Established: 12 October 1983; 42 years ago (Note: The following date was when the museum officially opened to the public. The museum's collection originates from a museum opened at the Central Experimental Farm in 1920.)
- Location: 901 Prince of Wales Drive, Ottawa, Ontario, Canada
- Coordinates: 45.387766°N 75.709083°W
- Type: Agricultural museum
- Visitors: 202,000 (FY2018–19)
- Director: Kerry-Leigh Burchill
- Website: ingeniumcanada.org/cafm

Ingenium
- Canada Agriculture and Food Museum; Canada Aviation and Space Museum; Canada Science and Technology Museum

The Canada Agriculture and Food Museum (French: Musée de l'agriculture et de l'alimentation du Canada) is a national agricultural museum in Ottawa, Ontario, Canada. Occupying several buildings within the Central Experimental Farm, the museum operates as a "working farm", and provides public programs and exhibitions on agriculture sciences, and on the history of agriculture in Canada. In addition to the exhibitions held on the grounds, the museum also organizes travelling exhibitions for other museums across the country.

The museum's collection originated from a museum established at the Central Experimental Farm in 1920, although a national agriculture museum was not opened by the federal government until October 1983, as the Agriculture Museum. Initially occupying only a dairy barn, the museum later expanded to include several other buildings on the Central Experimental Farm. The museum was renamed the Canada Agriculture Museum in May 2000, before it adopted its current name in May 2013.

== History ==
The collection of the Canada Agriculture and Food Museum originated from the museum operated at the Central Experimental Farm in 1920. Maintenance of the collection was later taken up by the National Museums of Canada (NMC), although some items from the collection were transferred to the Canadian Museum of Civilization, or the National Museum of Science and Technology.

In 1978, exploratory discussions took place regarding the feasibility of creating an agricultural museum within one of the heritage buildings of the Central Experimental Farm. In 1980, the upper floor of the dairy barn was selected to host an exhibition gallery for the collection. A memorandum was signed between Agriculture and Agri-Food Canada and NMC, where the former agreed to provide the facility, and renovate its upper levels to the requirements expected by the NMC; while the NMC agreed to operate the museum. The agricultural collection maintained by the NMC formed the nucleus for the agriculture museum's collection. Public Works Canada completed their renovations of the site in August 1983, with the NMC installing the museum's first two exhibitions, "Haying in Canada," and "A Barn of the Twenties;" the former an exhibition of farm equipment from 1840 to 1960, and the latter an immersive exhibit of a barn in the 1920s. The museum was formally opened on 12 October 1983 as the Agriculture Museum. Since opening the museum's operations has expanded beyond the dairy barn; with the museum operating seven buildings for public and administrative purposes.

The museum was initially operated by the NMC until it was dissolved in 1988. Management of the museum was later assumed by Ingenium, a crown corporation. The museum has since changed its name twice in the 21st century, first to the Canada Agriculture Museum in May 2000, and the Canada Agriculture and Food Museum in May 2013.

== Grounds ==
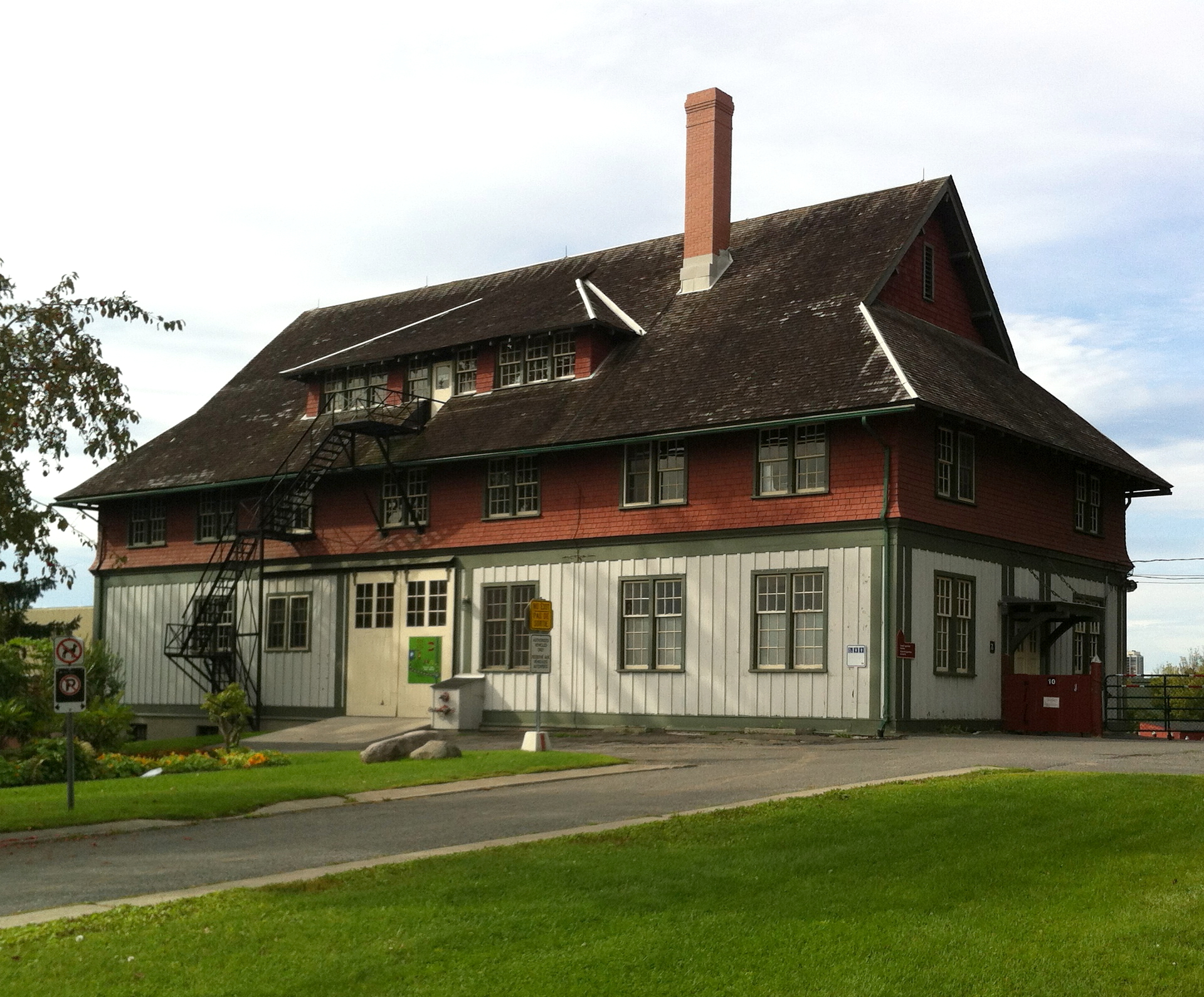
The Cereal Barn/Building 76 is an event space and one of several buildings on the Central Experimental Farm that is occupied by the museum

The museum property is situated within the Central Experimental Farm, a research centre for Agriculture and Agri-Food Canada, a department of the government of Canada. The museum occupies a number of buildings on the Central Experimental Farm, although all the buildings operated by the museum remain under the ownership of Agriculture and Agri-Food Canada.

The main building for the museum, the "Dairy Barn", or "Building 88," is a three-storey barn with a gable roof and two side wings. The building is made out of stone, wood shingles, and batten. Originally built in 1887–88, the building was later rebuilt in 1913, after a fire destroyed the original structure. Because of the buildings historical association with dairy farm research, the footprint of the building was designated as a Federal Heritage Building in 1987. The building houses the museum's exhibition spaces, as well as its dairy herd.

Other buildings operated by the museum includes the "Swine Showcase Building" or "Building 91". Built in 1911 and renovated during the 1930s, Building 91 was used to test swine until it was repurposed for museum use. Several other buildings on the property are also used by the museum as event spaces, including the "Meadowview Barn/Building 95" and the "Cereal Barn/Building 76". The Meadowview Barn was erected in 1912 to support dairy research, and is used by the museum to host special events and summer camps. The Cereal Barn is also used by the museum as an event space.

== Operations ==
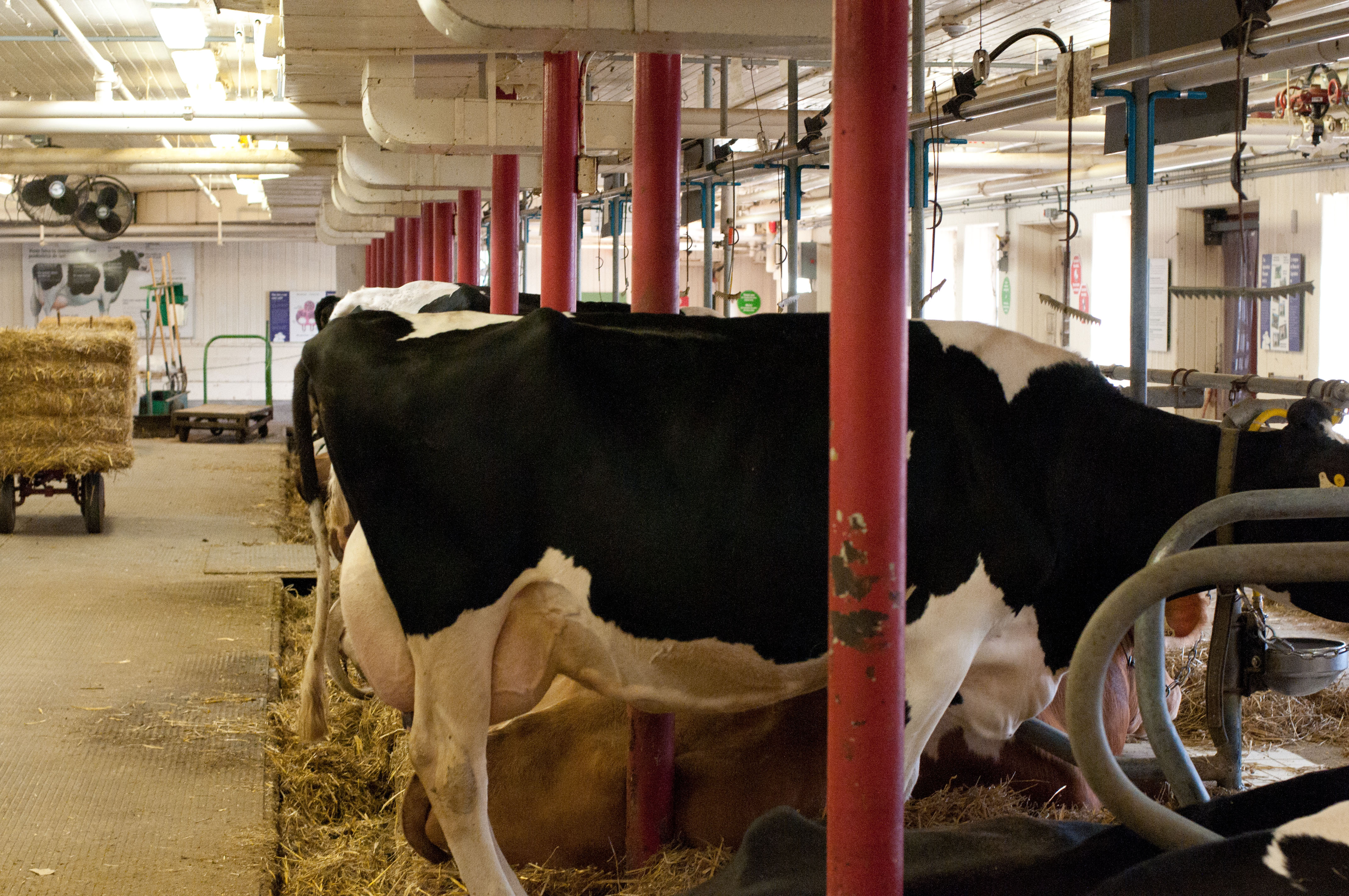
Dairy cattle inside the museum's main building. The museum is considered a "working farm" with a number of livestock on the property.

The museum is operated by Ingenium, a crown corporation responsible for preserving and protecting Canada's scientific and technical heritage. In addition to the Canada Agriculture and Food Museum, Ingenium also manages two other national museums of Canada, the Canada Aviation and Space Museum, and the Canada Science and Technology Museum.

Canada Agriculture and Food Museum provides programs and exhibitions on the history of agriculture in Canada, as well as the benefits and relationship with agricultural sciences. Situated within the Central Experimental Farm, the Canada Agriculture and Food Museum operates as a "working farm", with 150 farm animals available at the demonstration farm, including a herd of 50-head dairy herd, as well as horses, beef cattle, pigs, goats, poultry and sheep. In addition to exhibitions on the history of agriculture, the museum also holds a historical collection of tractors. The museum is affiliated with the Canadian Museums Association, the Canadian Heritage Information Network, and the Virtual Museum of Canada.

The museum also creates traveling exhibits which are brought to smaller museums throughout Canada. It has an outdoor "energy park" which showcases renewable energy sources. In addition to museum exhibits and other public programs, the museum also provides facility rentals for special events, and live demonstrations.

== See also ==
- Agriculture in Canada
- Manitoba Agricultural Museum
- Ontario Agricultural Museum
- Ornamental Gardens
