= Electronic sackbut =

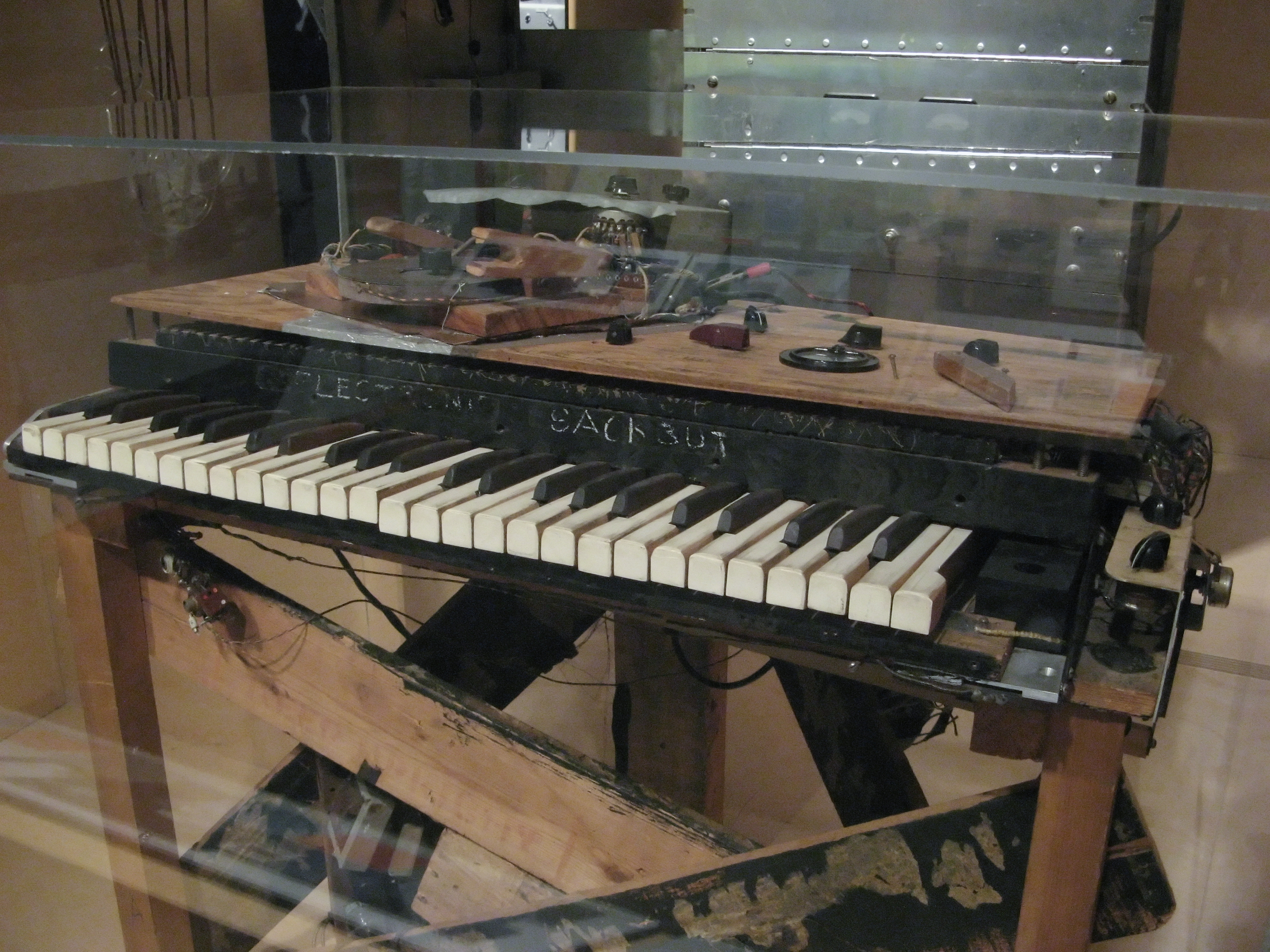
Electronic sackbut exhibited in the Canada Science and Technology Museum

The electronic sackbut is an electronic musical instrument designed and first built by Hugh Le Caine in 1945.

The electronic sackbut had a feature which resembles what has become the modulation wheels on modern synthesizers: The player used the left hand to modify the sound while the right hand was used to play the keyboard. This compares with today's synthesizers which have one or more modulation wheels to the left of the keyboard (often controlling modulation and pitch).

The controller modified volume, pitch, and timbre. Thus it was one of the first electronic instruments to use a three-dimensional continuous controller to modify the sound in a live situation. Such control is still rare in electronic instruments.

Le Caine began working full-time in a new lab at the National Research Council of Canada in 1954, where he built over 20 different new instruments before his death in 1977. While he developed four models of the electronic sackbut, none ever saw commercial production.

== See also ==
- Sackbut
- Ondes Martenot
