= Henry Seth Taylor steam buggy =

First known car built in Canada

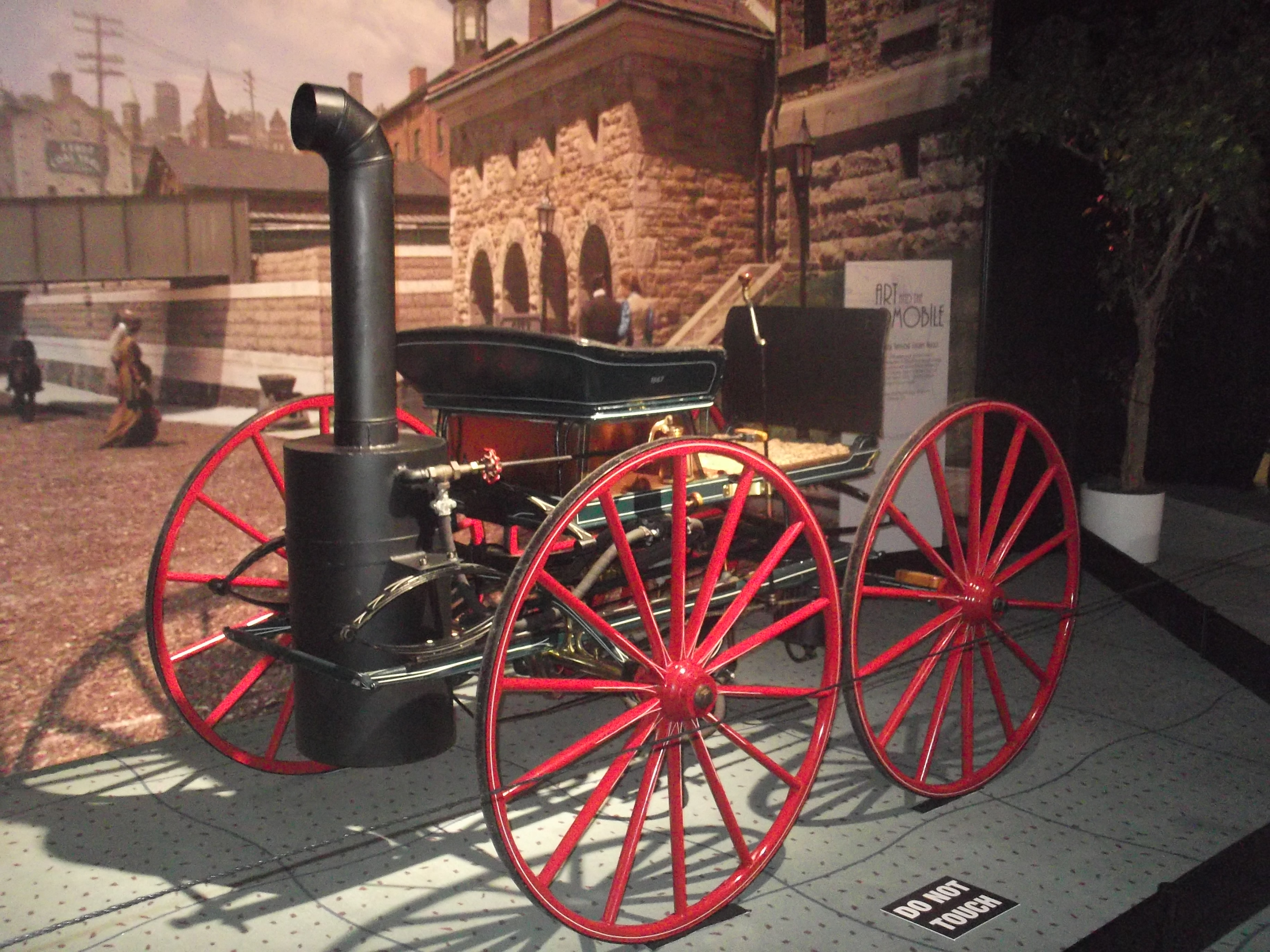
The Buggy on display at the 2015 Canadian International Auto Show.

The Henry Seth Taylor steam buggy is the first known car built in Canada. It was built by Henry Seth Taylor, a watchmaker and jeweller in Stanstead, Quebec in 1867. It was unveiled at the Stanstead Fall Fair that year. The vehicle was crashed into a creek shortly thereafter.

== Description ==
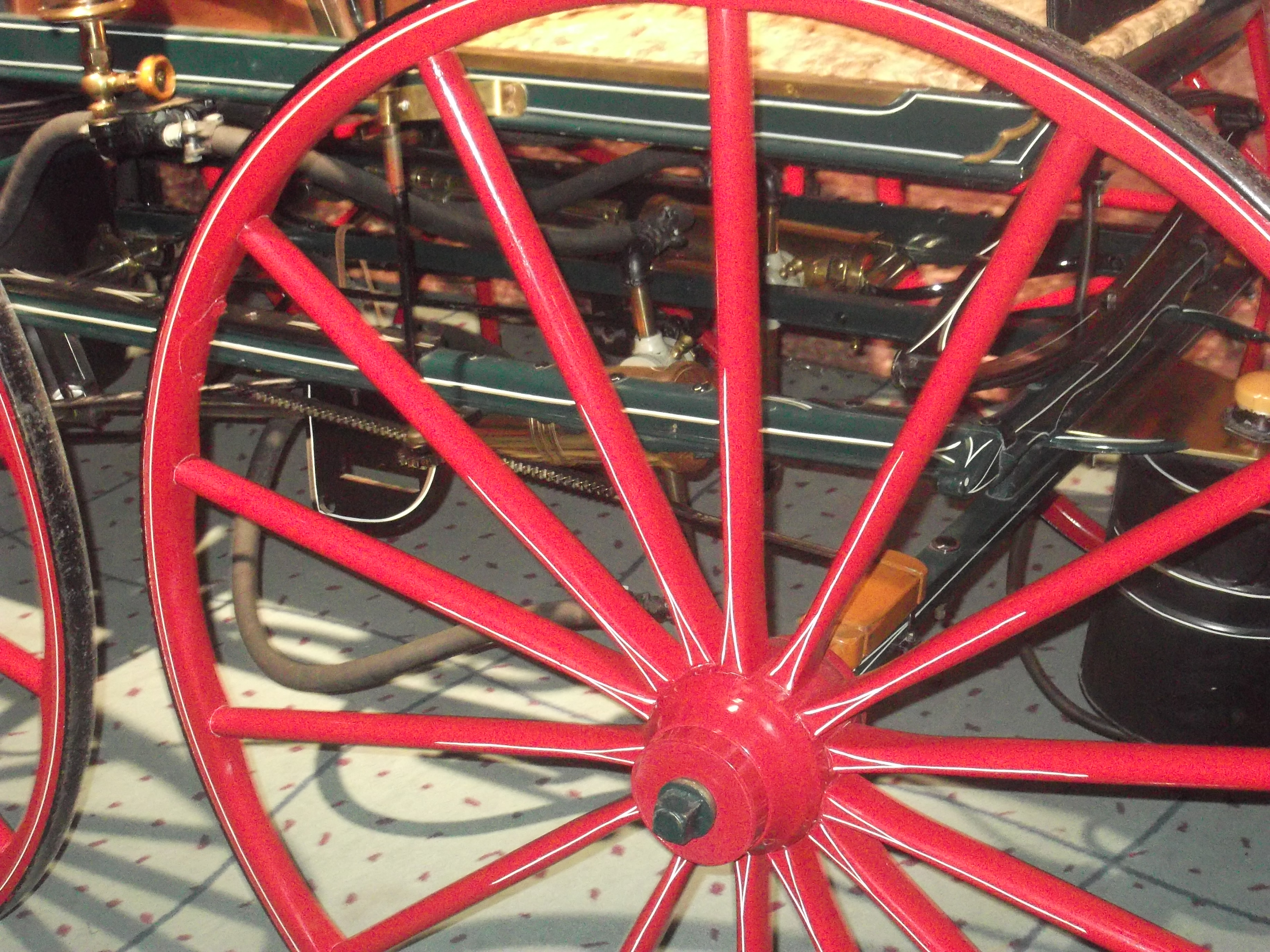
Detail of the wheel and hoses under the vehicle.

The Buggy was modeled after a US-built steam car Taylor had seen in 1864. It was designed by Taylor to have a coal-fired boiler for the carriage. Fully pressurized, the steam was used to move a piston attached to the rear axle, producing forward motion. The vehicle does not have a reverse gear or brakes. It was able to travel at a sustained 20 km/h (12 mph). The vehicle features thin strips of metal bent around the edge of the wheels in place of rubber tires. It is powered by a two-cylinder boiler mounted behind the driver. Steam is generated in the vertical coal-fired boiler, which is connected by rubber hoses to a six-gallon water tank located between the front wheels. The vehicle lacks a coal box, but has a storage nook for lump coal or wood under the driver’s perch.

The vehicle weighs 500 pounds (230 kg). The boiler (as designed) can withstand 60 pounds (27 kg) of pressure. It was the only example built, not having been meant for mass production; rather, it was exhibited as a curiosity at fairs around the area.

== History and preservation ==
The vehicle lay disassembled in a barn where the wood from the carriage body and wheels had rotted away; it was discovered in the 1950s and was purchased and later restored by American collector Richard Stewart. In 1983, it was purchased from Stewart by the Canada Science and Technology Museum in Ottawa, where it has remained since. The original brass-work around the cylinders and the oil caps were found to be in "fantastic condition", but the boiler has been replaced two times.

== Media ==
The vehicle is featured on a 43-cent stamp issued by Canada Post in 1993, as part of the Historic Land Vehicles series. It also is mentioned in the opening to Canada's Worst Driver in the 7th episode of Season 8.
