= Canada Science and Technology Museum =

National museum in Ottawa, Ontario

- Musée des sciences et de la technologie du Canada

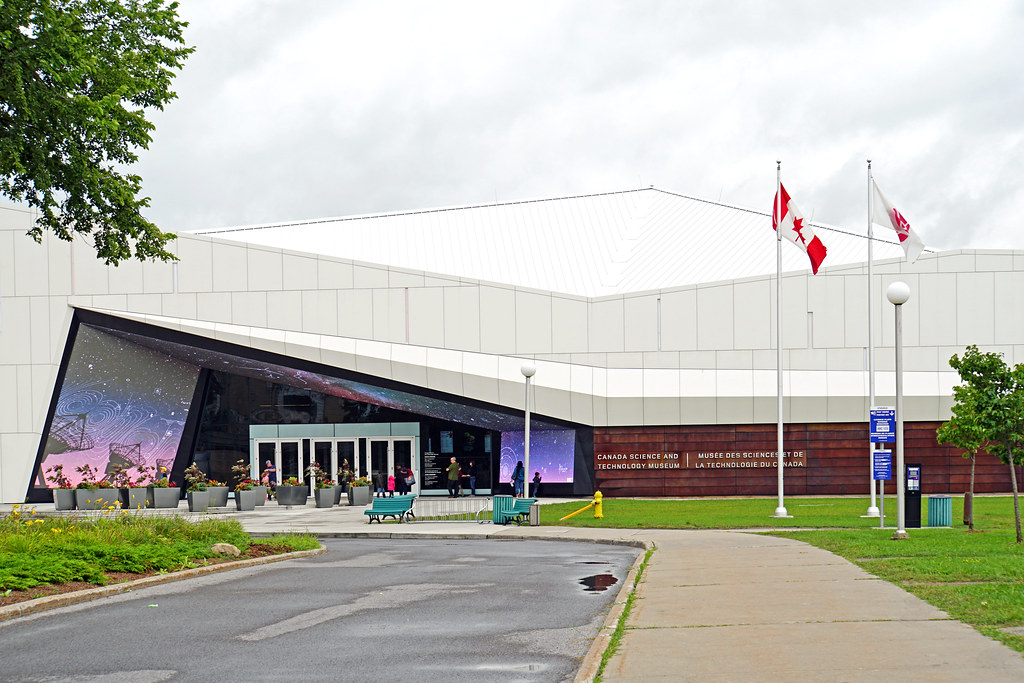
- Exterior of the Canada Science and Technology Museum
- Former name: National Museum of Science and Technology (1968–2000)
- Established: 1 April 1968 (Note: The museum originates from the science and technology branch formed in 1966 by the defunct National Museum of Canada. The National Museum of Canada was split up on 1 April 1968, with the science and technology branch becoming the National Museum of Science and Technology.)
- Location: 1867 St. Laurent Boulevard, Ottawa, Ontario, Canada
- Coordinates: 45°24′13″N 75°37′08″W
- Type: Science and technology museum
- Director general: Lisa Leblanc
- Owner: Ingenium
- Website: ingeniumcanada.org/scitech

Ingenium
- Canada Agriculture and Food Museum; Canada Aviation and Space Museum; Canada Science and Technology Museum

The Canada Science and Technology Museum (abbreviated as CSTM; French: Musée des sciences et de la technologie du Canada) is a national museum of science and technology in Ottawa, Ontario, Canada. The museum has a mandate to preserve and promote the country's scientific and technological heritage. The museum is housed in a 13,458 square metres (144,860 sq ft) building. The museum is operated by Ingenium, a Crown corporation that also operates two other national museums of Canada.

The museum originated as the science and technology branch of the defunct National Museum of Canada. The branch opened its own building in 1967, and subsequently became its own institution in 1968, named the National Museum of Science and Technology. The museum adopted its current name in 2000. The museum's building underwent significant renovations from 2014 to 2017, which saw most of the original structure renovated.

The museum's collection contains over 20,000 artifact lots with 60,000 individual objects, some of which are on display in the museum's exhibitions. The museum also hosts and organizes a number of temporary and travelling exhibitions.

== History ==
The institution originates from the science and technology branch of the defunct National Museum of Canada. The National Museum of Canada originates from an institution formed in 1842, although its science and technology branch was not formed until 1966.

The science and technology branch was headed by its own director, David McCurdy Baird, and had a small collection of artifacts transferred under its care by the National Museum of Canada. Baird was hired as the museum's first director in October 1966 to help oversee the design and installation of the science and technology museum. In April 1967, the former bakery and distribution centre for Morrison Lamothe in the outskirts of Ottawa was selected for use by the science and technology branch. The building opened to the public on 16 November 1967. In its first year, the museum attracted over 400,000 visitors.

On 1 April 1968, the different branches of the National Museum of Canada were split up into several different institutions, with the museum's human history branch forming the National Museum of Man, the natural history branch forming the National Museum of Natural Sciences, and the science and technology branch forming the National Museum of Science and Technology. The National Museums of Canada Corporation was also formed that year to manage the new institutions, including the National Museum of Science and Technology.

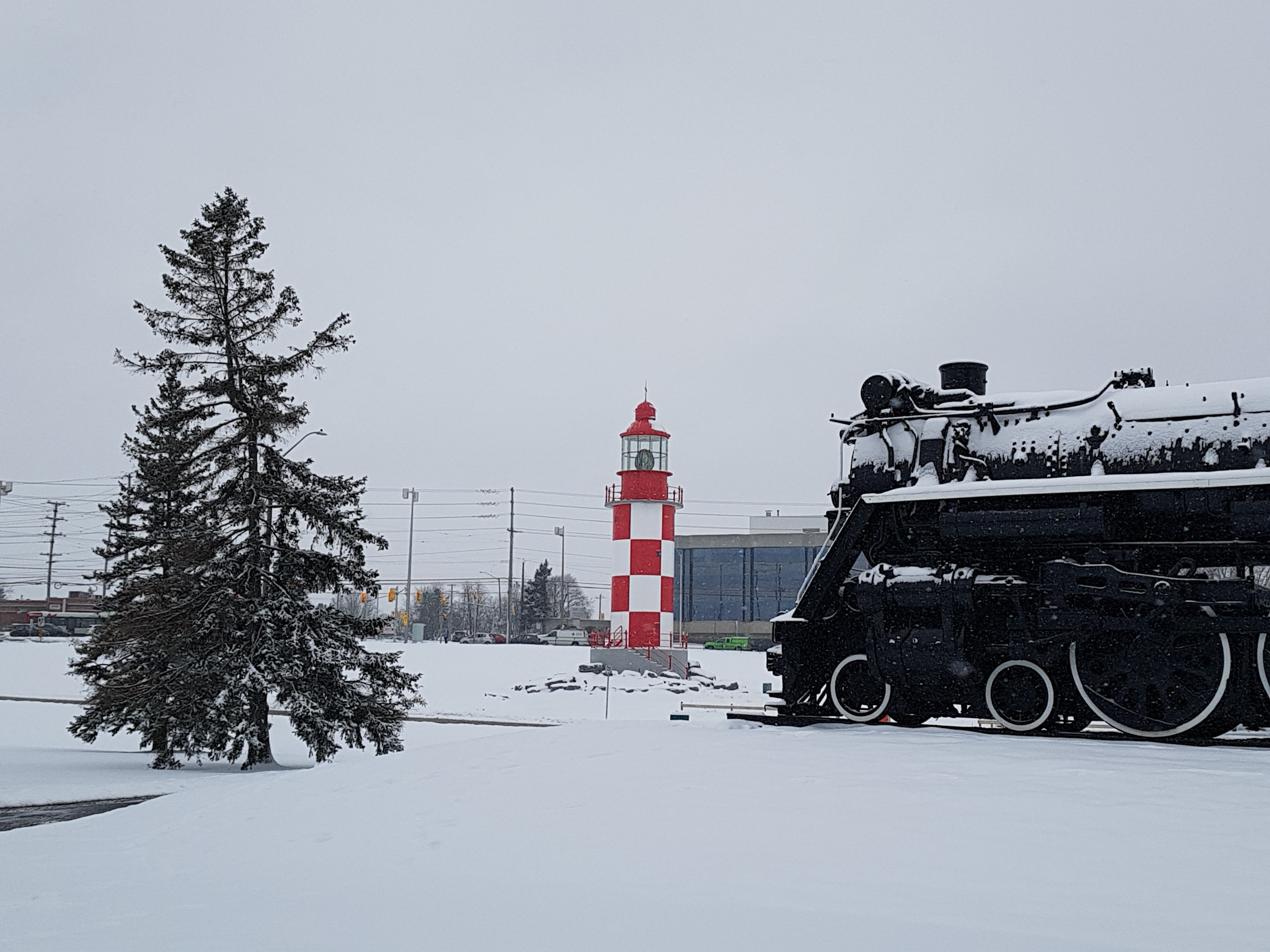
A lighthouse and Confederation locomotive outside the museum in 2017. These artifacts were placed outside during the late-20th century.

The museum's early exhibition designs were inspired by equivalent museums in Europe that emphasized interactive exhibitions. A number of larger artifacts were installed outside the museum, including an Atlas long-range rocket in 1973, and a pre-fabricated iron lighthouse in 1980. The lighthouse was originally built during the 1860s in Cape North, Nova Scotia, before it was disassembled and brought to Ottawa.

In 1990, the National Museums of Canada Corporation was disbanded. A new Crown corporation, Ingenium, was formed through the Museums Act, 1990 to manage the National Museum of Science and Technology, alongside the Canada Aviation Museum and the Agriculture Museum.

=== 21st century ===
In 2000, the National Museum of Science and Technology was renamed the Canada Science and Technology Museum. During the early 2000s, several plans were proposed by the federal government to move the museum building from its location to a new site.

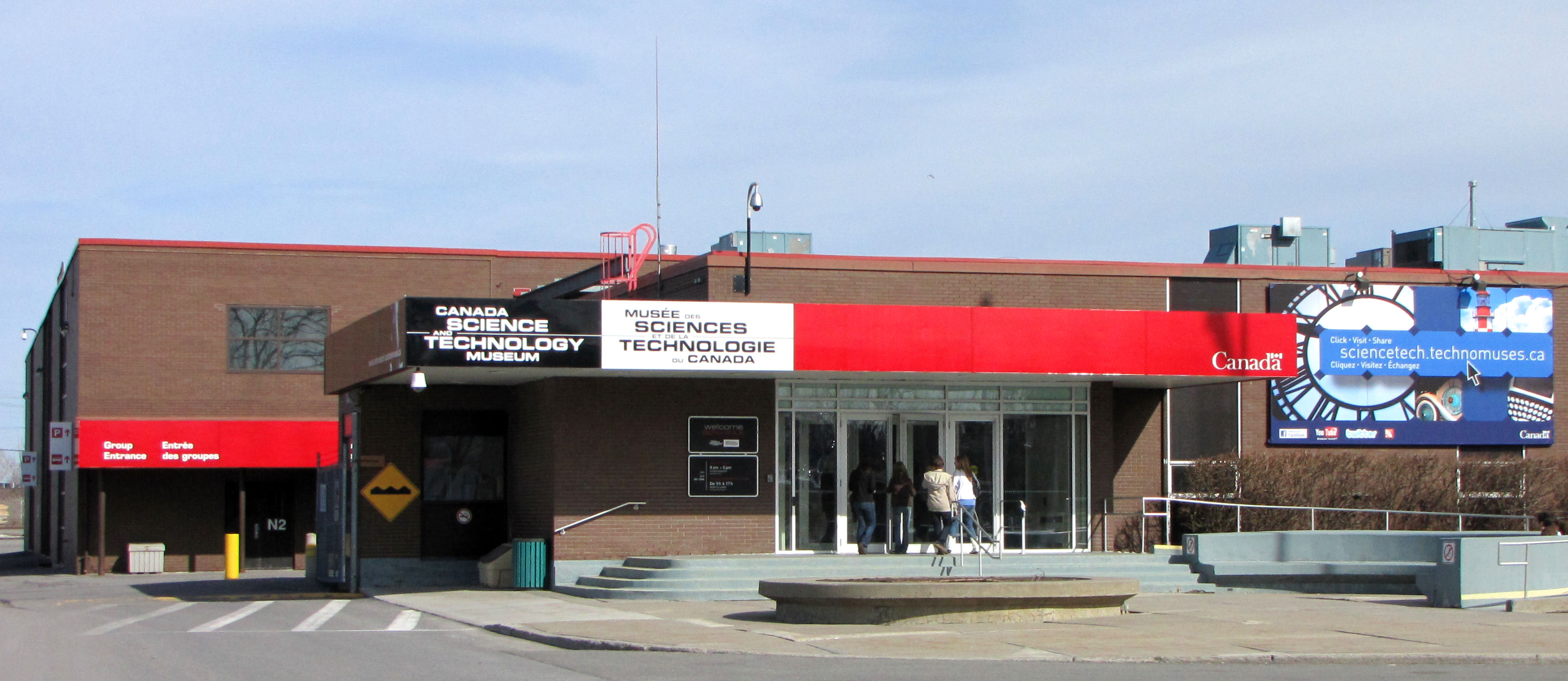
Exterior façade of the museum building in 2010, prior to the building's renovation later that decade.

In 2012, the museum was prompted to modify a travelling exhibition on human sexuality after receiving criticism from select groups and James Moore, the minister of Canadian Heritage. The museum removed a video covering masturbation from the exhibition and placed a minimum age requirement to view the exhibition.

The museum was forced to close its doors to the public in September 2014 after it found high levels of airborne mould in the building, and its southern wall risked collapse. In November 2014, it was announced that the building would remain closed to the public until 2017, as a part of a C$80.5 million overhaul of the building's interior and façade, and expand the building's exhibition space.

During the closure, several larger artifacts displayed outside, including the Atlas rocket and a pumpjack originally from Saskatchewan were dismantled. The former was dismantled and destroyed in accordance with the rocket's owner, the United States Air Force, whereas the latter was dismantled and placed in storage. During the building's closure, the institution lent out the museum's exhibitions for public display. The new building was reopened to the public on 17 November 2017.

As a result of the renovations, portraits of Canadian Science and Engineering Hall of Fame inductees were removed from the museum and relocated online.

In 2018, the museum announced it had suspended large-scale collecting efforts, until new storage facilities at the Ingenium Centre were completed, and its excess items were moved inside it.

== Grounds ==
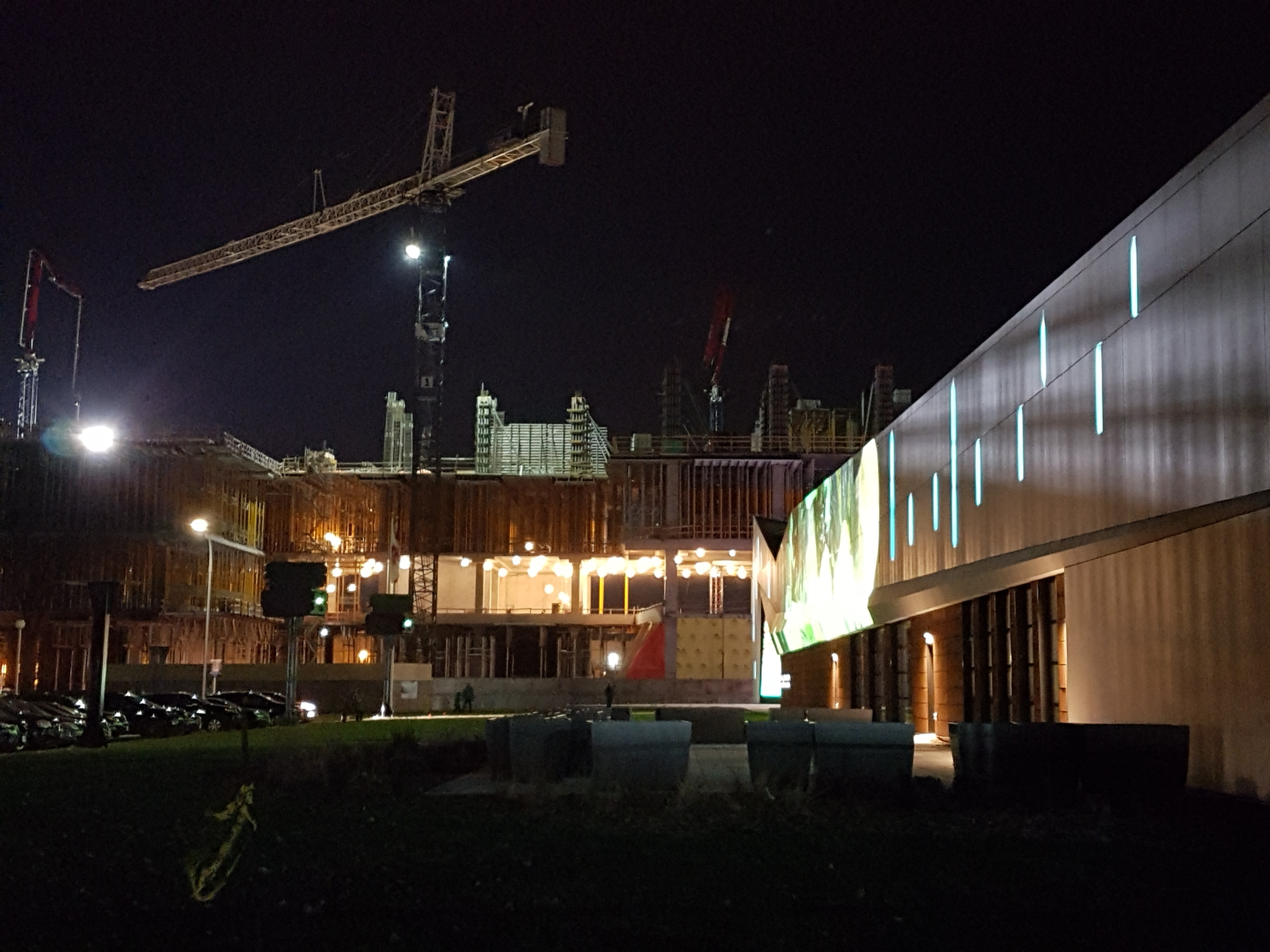
Grounds of the Canada Science and Technology Museum at night in 2017. Construction for the Ingenium Centre is visible in the background.

The museum is situated in Ottawa, adjacent to the Sheffield Glen neighbourhood on St. Laurent Boulevard. The museum building is situated next to the Ingenium Centre, a building that houses Ingenium's research labs and storage facilities for museums operated by the Crown corporation, including the Canada Science and Technology Museum, the Canada Aviation and Space Museum, and the Canadian Agriculture and Food Museum. Prior to the construction of the Ingenium Centre, the site was occupied by the museum's observatory; which was dismantled in 2016.

The grounds of the museum includes a 4.0 hectares (10 acres) park in front of the building, and includes a pathway that leads to the building's entrance. The most recent changes to the surrounding park occurred with the approval of a new landscaping project approved by the National Capital Commission in 2017.

=== Building ===
The museum first occupied the site in 1967, having repurposed a pre-existing bakery and distribution centre for its own use. The building was later renovated and expanded to 13,458 square metres (144,860 sq ft) from 2014 to 2017, with designs by Canadian architecture firm NORR. The 2014 to 2017 renovations also saw a number of improvements added to the building, including seismic upgrades to the facility, and a complete replacement of the roof which also supports photovoltaic panels. A new mechanical room was also built, allowing staff to more precisely control the temperature in the building, and better host fragile artifacts susceptible to damage.

The façade at the entrance of the museum features an articulated roof. The articulated roof at the entrance is raised 12 metres (40 ft) in height, and includes 108.9 square metres (1,172 sq ft) canopy. The building's entrance is cladded in a white ceramic material that doubles as a 76-metre-long (250 ft) projection screen. In total, approximately 2,025.2 square metres (21,799 sq ft) of ceramic material was used throughout the building's façade. To accommodate the colder climate, the ceramic white tiles were installed with Neolith stone slabs. Use of the Neolith slabs also allowed NORR to incorporate sharp angles and smooth expanses into their building designs. A three-minute looping video is played on the LED surface, with a second phase of the film projected on the flat ceramic wall facing St. Laurent Boulevard during the evenings.

The interior entrance of the museum features an interactive light and sound display inspired after auroras. The building's contains five main galleries, a temporary exhibition space, an artifacts gallery, creative spaces and classrooms, theatres, cafeterias, boutiques, and offices. The building contains over 7,400 square metres (80,000 sq ft) of exhibition space, including a 850 square metres (9,200 sq ft) temporary exhibition hall for travelling exhibitions. The museum's chiller boiler system provides localized heating and cooling controls, and is designed with glazed walls from the exhibit spaces, acting as a functional exhibit for the museum with its colour coded piping.

== Exhibitions ==
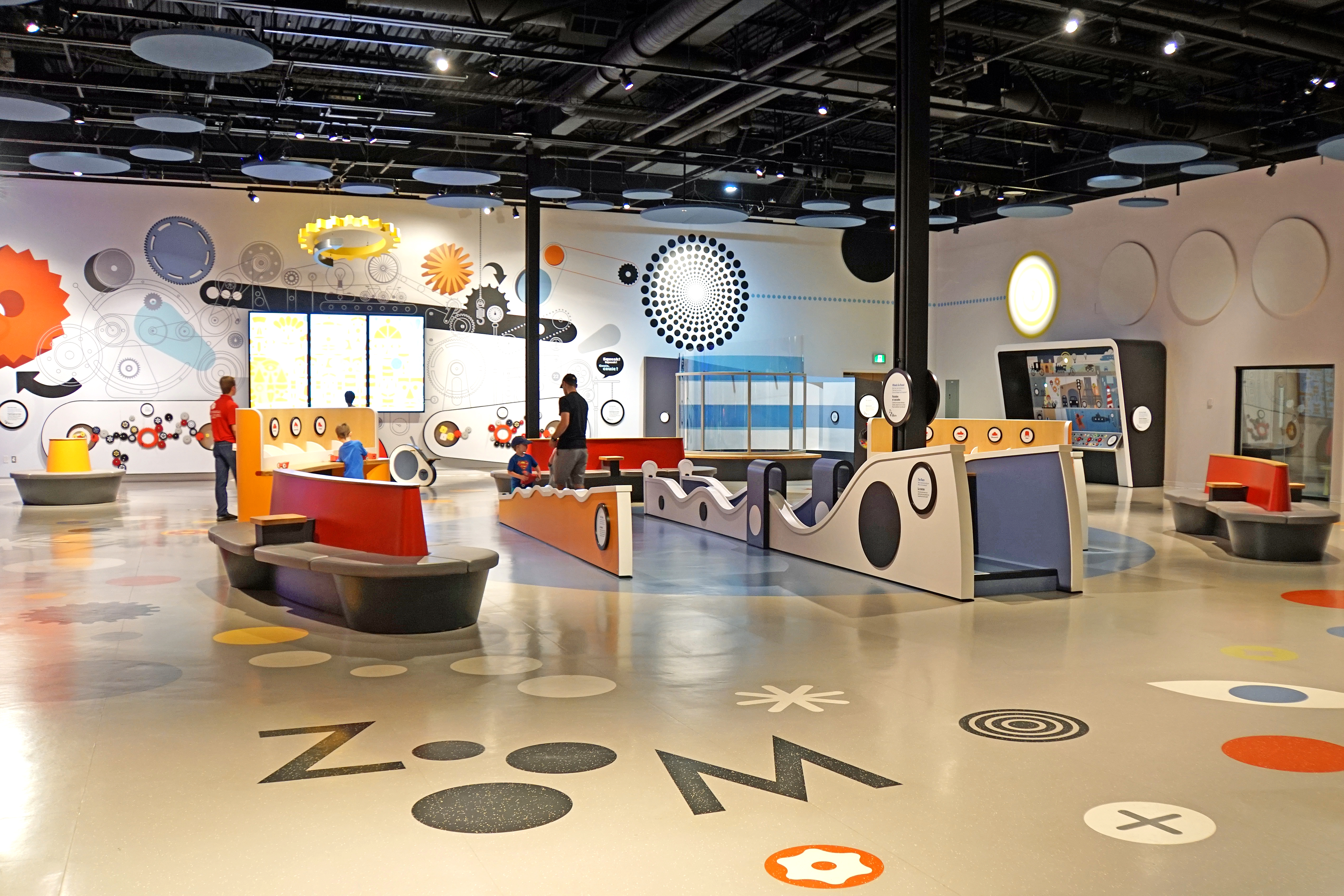
The ZOOOM Children's Innovation Zone is an interactive exhibition at the museum

The museum organizes a number of permanent, temporary, and travelling exhibitions. The museum's permanent and temporary exhibitions place an emphasis on being interactive with visitors. Although the museum is primarily interactive, a number of traditional display cases containing a variety of artifacts is also spread throughout the museum's exhibitions.

The museum has also organized exhibitions alongside other Canadian governmental agencies, with the Cipher-Decipher travelling exhibition having been organized in partnership with the Communications Security Establishment. Some exhibitions feature exhibits with corporate sponsors, such as the ZOOOMobile, a car building station sponsored by Michelin. Although several exhibits have corporate sponsors, the museum retains all rights and control over the content of the exhibition.

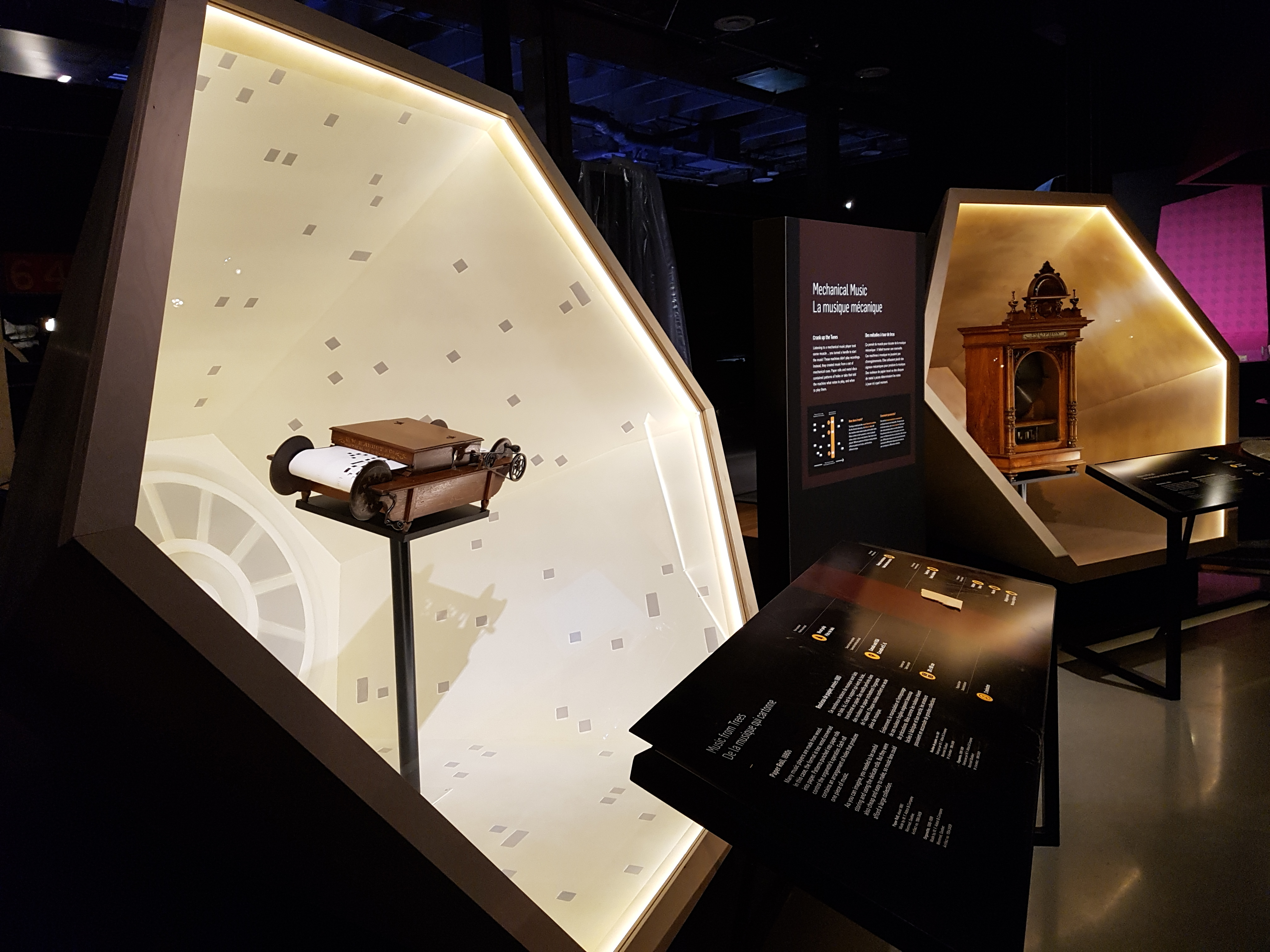
Musical artifacts from the museum's collection on display in the Sound by Design exhibition

Permanent exhibitions include Artifact Alley, an exhibition at the centre of the museum that features over 700 artifacts on display; the Sound by Design, an interactive exhibition where visitors can try a variety of instruments and musical inventions; and The Great Outdoors, an exhibition on transportation and outdoor recreation. The permanent exhibition Medical Sensations also includes an interactive exhibit that allows visitors to see the bone structure inside their body, and their muscle and blood systems. The medical exhibition occupies 330 square metres (3,500 sq ft) of space, and includes nearly 100 pieces from the museum's collection. A specimen bottle containing the first appendix removed through an appendectomy, by Abraham Groves, is on display in the exhibition. Wearable Tech is a permanent exhibition at the museum which displays a variety of body-worn artifacts drawn from the museum's collections, including a modernized amauti, Google Glass, and Newtsuit. Crazy Kitchen is an exhibition that explores human perception, and is the oldest permanent exhibition maintained by the museum. Crazy Kitchen and the locomotives installed inside are the only remaining exhibits that date back to the museum's opening in 1967. Since its renovations in 2017, the locomotives have formed part of an exhibit on steam power, being exhibited next to a steam engine from a Canadian Coast Guard ship.

== Collections ==
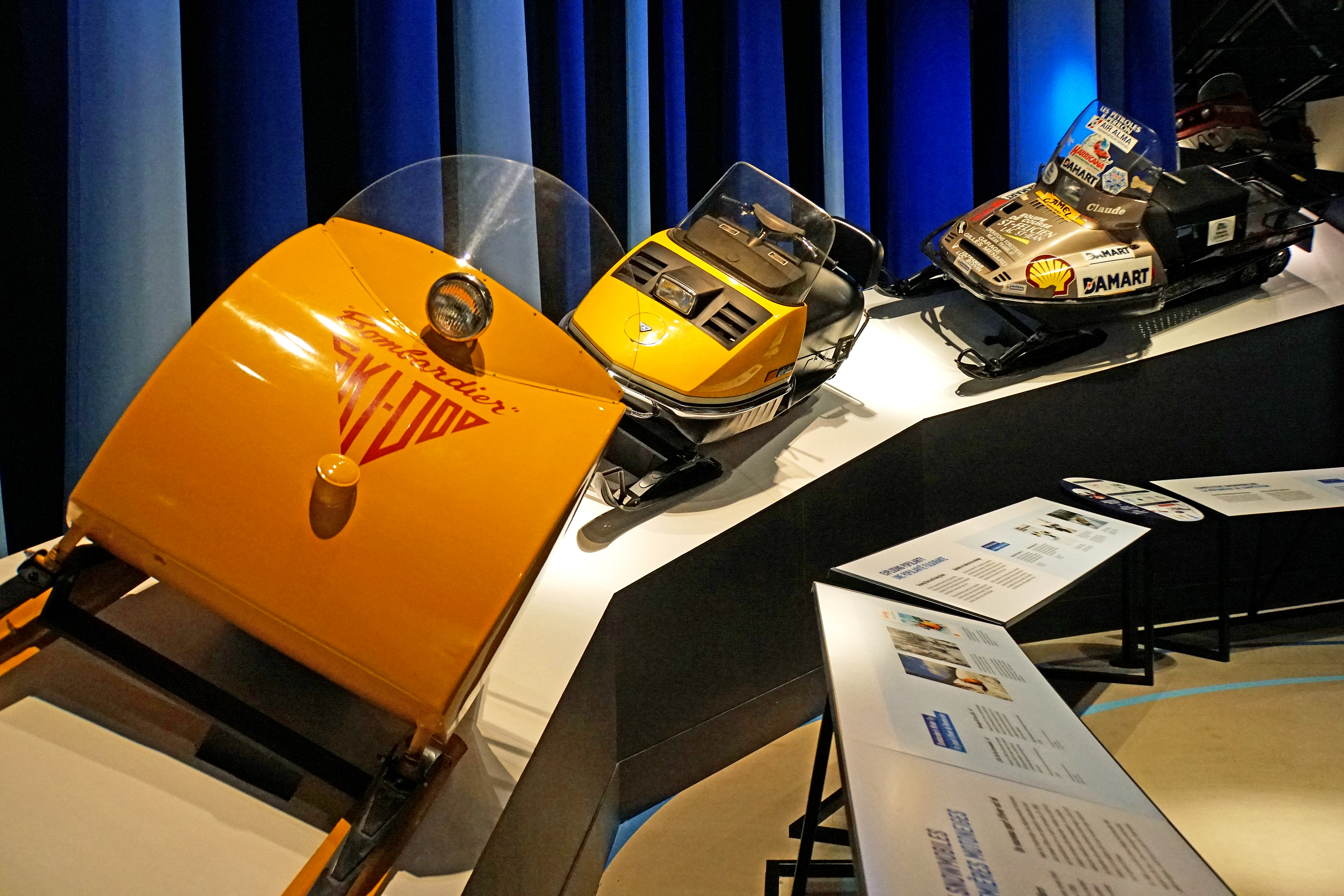
Several snowmobiles on display in an exhibit on the technology's evolution and its impact in Canada

The museum's collection preserves objects and data relating to the scientific and technological heritage of the country. The museum's collections originates from a small collection of artifacts transferred to the institution from the defunct National Museum of Canada in 1966. In 1989, the museum adopted a collection development strategy that provided its collection team with a more focused approach to explore how science and technology contributed to the "transformation of Canada".

The museum's collection has grown through acquisitions and donations. Approximately 90 per cent of items in the museum's collection are donated, most of whom were gifted to the museum at the donor's initiative. However, the museum does not accept conditional donations. As of 2021, the permanent collection includes approximately 20,000 artifact lots with 60,000 individual objects and 80,000 photos and other associated archival materials; providing the museum with the largest collection of scientific and technological artifacts in Canada. Items from the collection date from the 12th century to present. Items from the museum's collection that are not on display are stored in the Ingenium Centre's storage facilities. Items from the museum's library and archives is also located in the Ingenium Centre, sharing facilities with the Canada Agriculture and Food Museum.

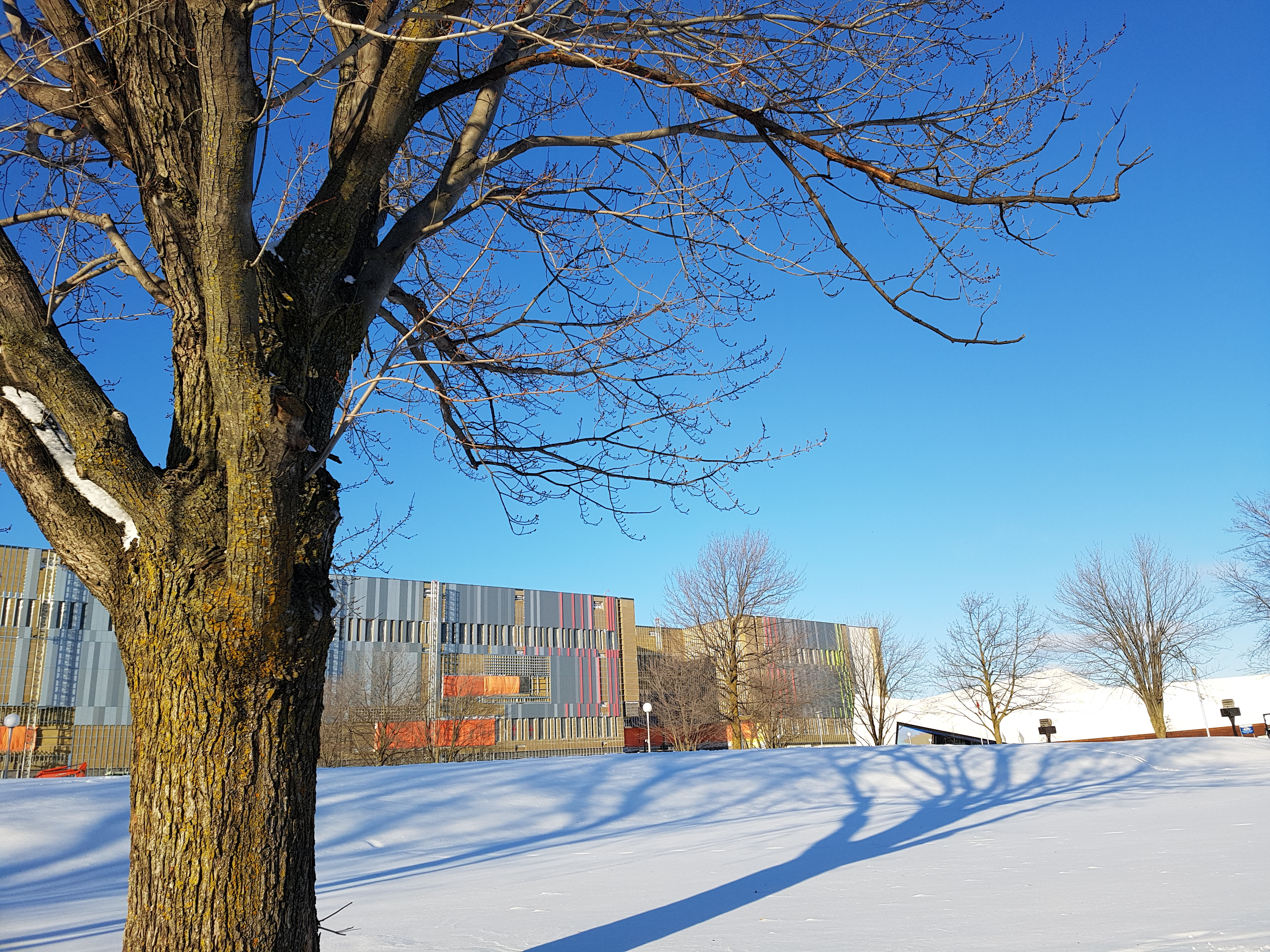
The Ingenium Centre next to the museum. Items not on display at the museum are stored at the Ingenium Centre

The collection is organized into eight categories, communications; computing and mathematics; domestic technologies; energy and mining; industrial technology; medical technology; scientific instruments; and transportation.

The permanent collection also contains several smaller collections. The CN Photo Collection is a collection of 750,000 photographs dating as early as the 1850s. The collection was donated to the museum by the Canadian National Railway in 1999. The Petrovic collection is a collection of over 130 artifacts including rulers, compasses, and other measuring instruments from the 12th to 19th centuries. The collection was purchased by the museum for C$35,000 in 1980. The museum also has a collection of radio artifacts numbering 70 pieces; and a collection of 60 kites, primarily from Asia.

The museum's medical collection also has a medical collection numbering over 8,000 pieces, most of which originated from the former Academy of Medicine Collection. In 2021, the museum started a COVID-19 pandemic collection, whose earliest items includes the Pfizer–BioNTech COVID-19 vaccine, and the 10-millionth face mask produced at CAMI Automotive.

All items that are deaccessioned from the museum's collection must be approved by its board of trustees and offered to another museum before it is disposed of through other channels like Crown Assets Distribution.

=== Rail equipment ===
The museum has acquired a large collection of railway rolling stock from various railways, particularly of Canadian National and Canadian Pacific.

In locomotive pavilion
| Number | Image | Type | Model | Built | Builder | Former owner | Status |
|---|---|---|---|---|---|---|---|
| 926 | | Steam | 4-6-0 | 1911 | CPR Angus Shops | Canadian Pacific Railway | Display |
| 2858 | | Steam | 4-6-4 | 1938 | Montreal Locomotive Works | Canadian Pacific Railway | Display |
| 3100 | | Steam | 4-8-4 | 1928 | CPR Angus Shops | Canadian Pacific Railway | Display |
| 6400 | | Steam | 4-8-4 | 1936 | Montreal Locomotive Works | Canadian National Railway | Display |

=== Notable items ===
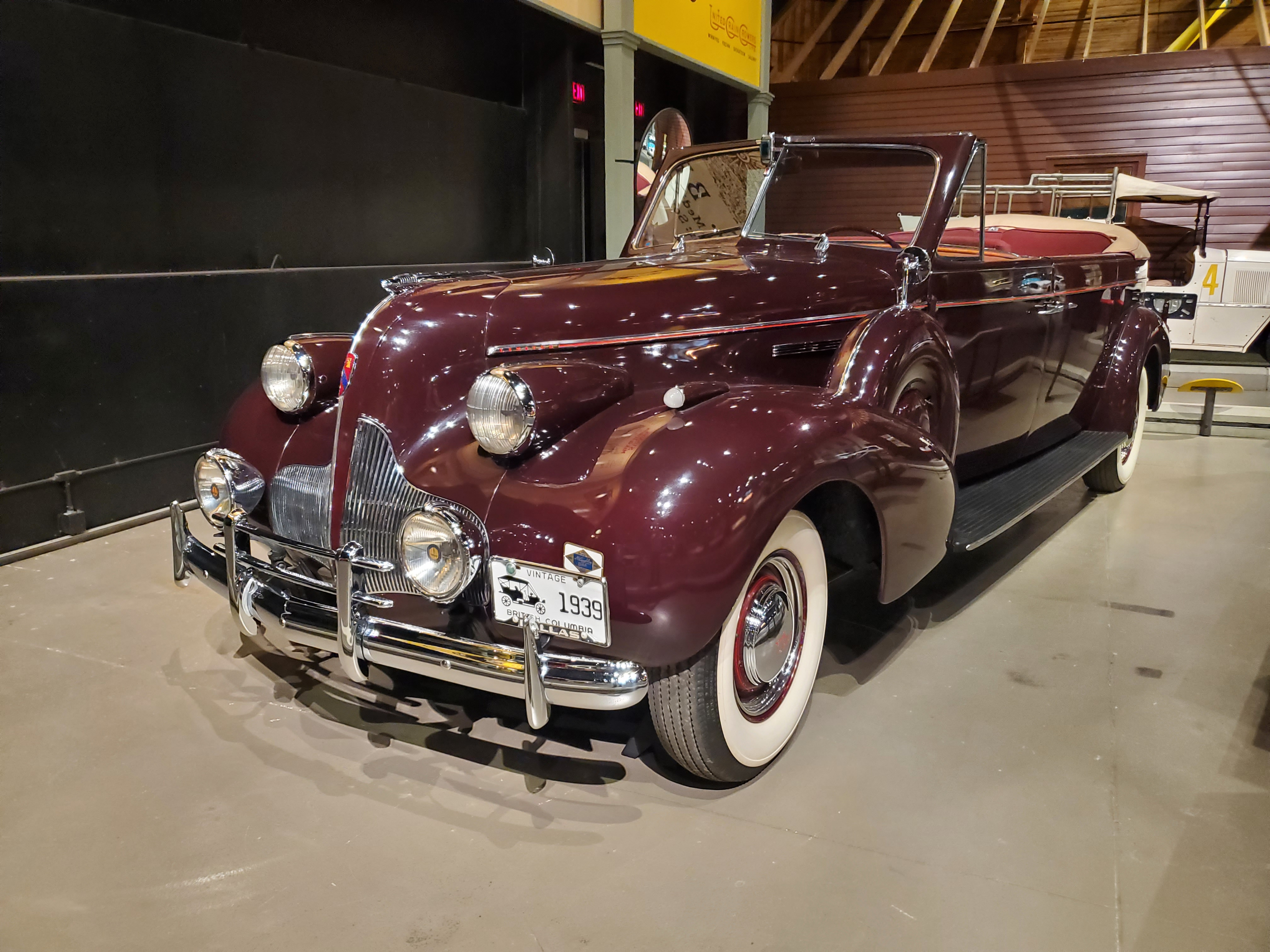
A McLaughlin-Buick Model 4929 used for the 1939 royal tour of Canada

Notable artifacts related to transportation include the last spike for the transcontinental Canadian Pacific Railway; a McLaughlin-Buick and railway car used during the 1939 royal tour of Canada; the Bras d'Or prototype hydrofoil; two nocturnals dating back to 17th century; a Popemobile, donated to the museum in 1985 by the Canadian Conference of Catholic Bishops; and a Henry Seth Taylor steam buggy, the first automobile produced in Canada. The museum acquired the steam buggy in 1984.

Notable computational artifacts in the museum's collection include two Millionaire calculators; and the DRTE Computer, which was gifted to the museum in 1968.

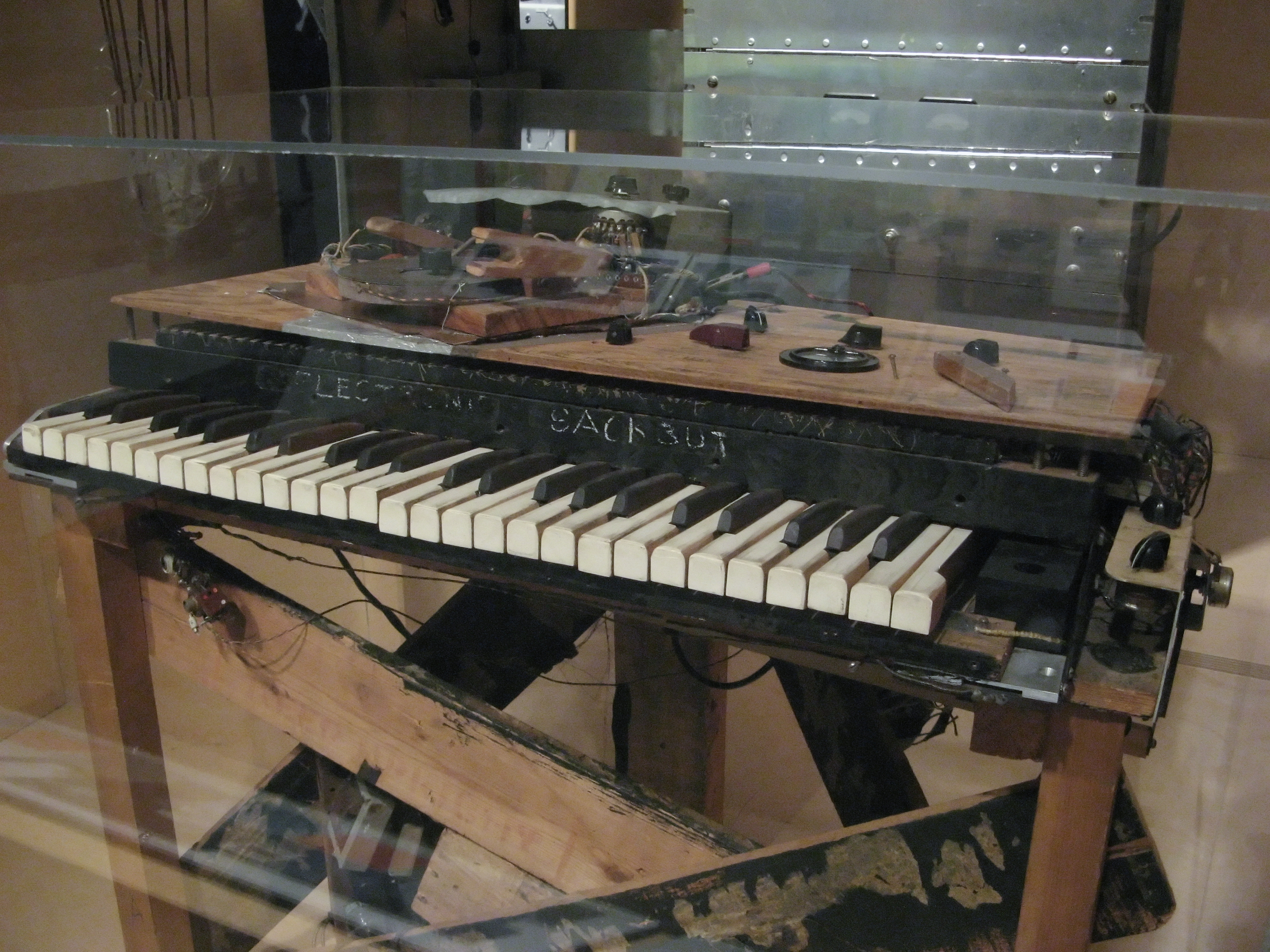
An electronic sackbut from the museum's collection on display

Other notable artifacts in the museum's collection includes an electronic sackbut; the first electron microscope produced in North America; the country's largest refracting telescope, from the Dominion Observatory; the original hitchBOT that travelled across Canada; and George Klein's prototype for the world's first motorized wheelchair. The Canada Science and Technology Museum acquired the prototype from the National Museum of American History in 2005.

== Research ==
In the first 20 years of operation, the museum's collecting and research efforts focused on "type collecting," as curators attempted to assemble a collection of different types of machines, and researched only their function and internal operations. A shift towards public history and exploring the cultural role these technologies played in society did not emerge until the 1980s.

The museum hosts a research facility for the University of Ottawa known as The Living Lab, which provides university researchers with a space to conduct research with children outside a "sterile laboratory environment".

The museum publishes an academic journal known as the Material Culture Review in partnership with the Canadian Museum of History since the 1970s. The journal provides a forum for research on historical artifacts collected by Canadian museums.

== See also ==
- List of museums in Ottawa
- List of science museums
