= MBLE Épervier =

Épervier
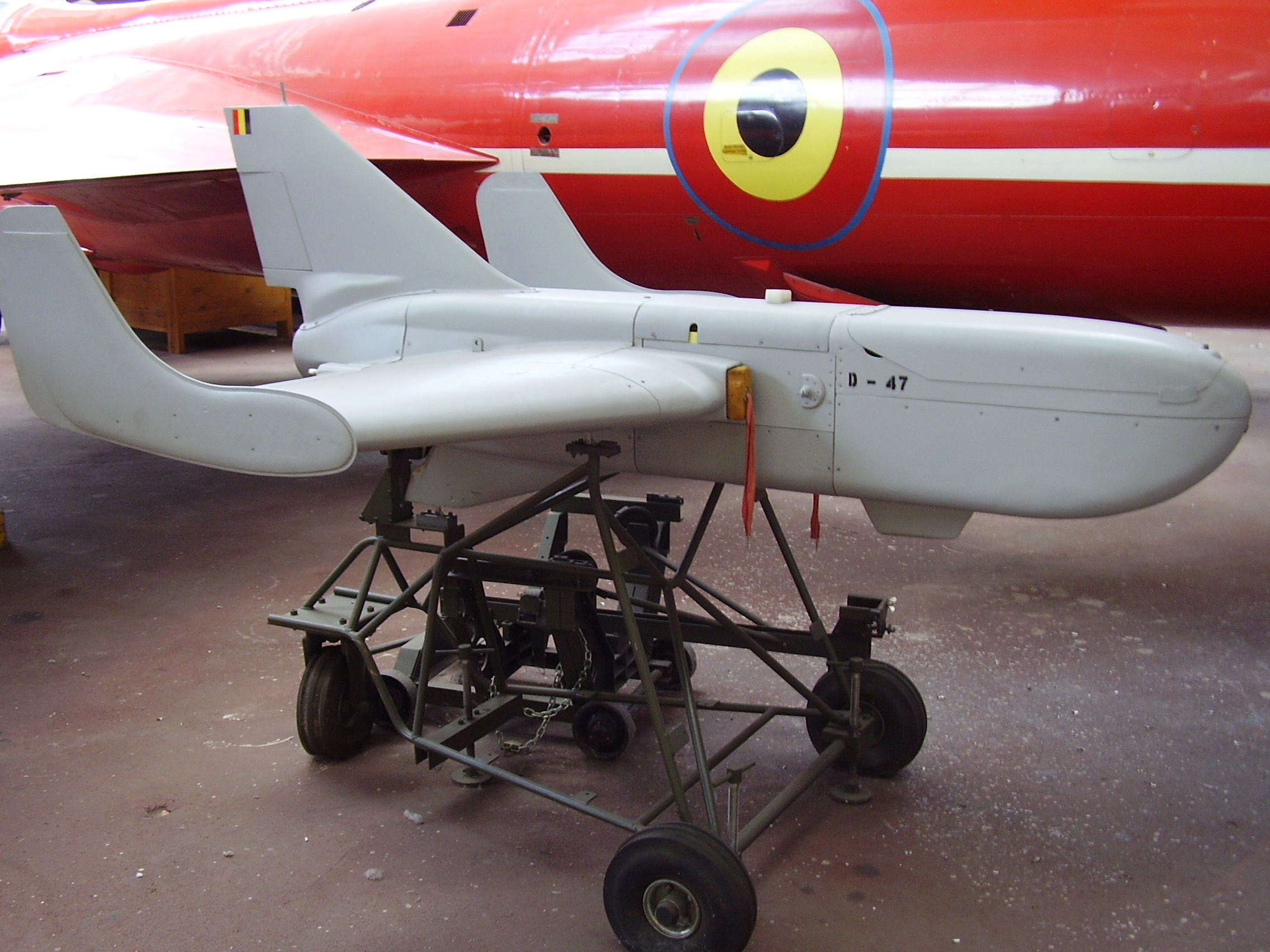

General information
- Type: Battlefield reconnaissance drone
- National origin: Belgium
- Manufacturer: Manufacture Belge De Lampes Et De Matériel Electronique
- Primary user: Belgian Army

The MBLE Épervier (English: Sparrowhawk) was a 1970s Belgian battlefield reconnaissance system which included an X-5 air vehicle, a launcher and a drone control centre. It served with the Belgian Army until 1999.

== Design and development ==
Originally the Épervier system was designed to meet a NATO requirement and in July 1969 the Belgian Government decided to fund the development programme, a cooperation contract with Manufacture Belge De Lampes Et De Matériel Electronique (MBLE)^{(fr, nl)} was signed in early 1971. Early prototypes of the drone (designated X-1 to X-4) were flown to prove the concept and at the end of the 1972 in to 1973 the system underwent an operational evaluation, it proved an ability to photograph a target up to 70 km (43 miles) away in either guided or programmed mode.

The X-5 air vehicle is an unmanned monoplane drone powered by a Lucas TJ 125 turbojet, and built under contract by Fairey SA. It has a truncated delta wing with endplate fins and a central fin. The X-5 can carry 70mm day or night cameras and infra-red line-scanning equipment which can transmit real-time data.

The launcher is a short orientable ramp, the drone is recovered by parachute. The Drone Control Centre has all the equipment to for guiding and tracking the air vehicle. The system also has a mobile photographic processing and interpretation unit.

== Operational history ==
Following further evaluation and testing the Épervier entered service with the Belgian Army in 1977 and served until 1999.

== Operators ==
Belgium

- Belgian Army

== Specifications (X-5) ==
Data from Jane's All the World's Aircraft 1973-74

General characteristics

- Length: 2.38 m (7 ft 9.75 in)
- Wingspan: 1.72 m (5 ft 7.75 in)
- Height: 0.92 m (3 ft 0.25 in)
- Gross weight: 142 kg (313 lb)
- Powerplant: 1 × Lucas TJ 125 turbojet , 0.50 kN (114 lbf) thrust

Performance

- Cruise speed: 500 km/h (312 mph, 271 kn)
- Endurance: 25+ minutes
- Service ceiling: 1,830 m (6,000 ft)

== See also ==
Related lists

- List of unmanned aerial vehicles
