= Ross Farm Museum =

Coordinates: 44°43′59″N 64°27′24″W

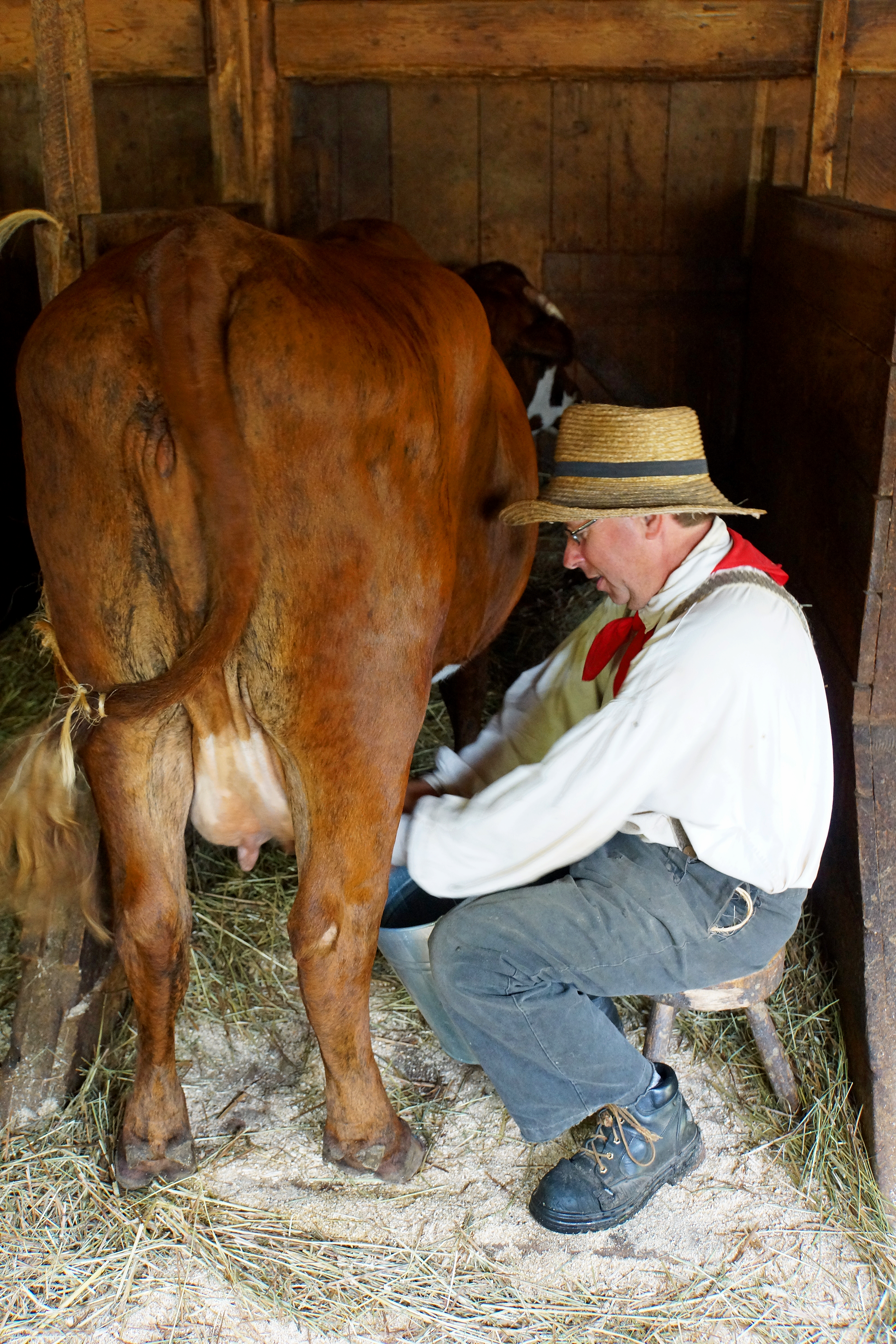
- Location: New Ross, Nova Scotia, Canada
- Type: agricultural museum
- Website: museum.gov.ns.ca/rfm/

The Ross Farm Museum is an agricultural museum located in New Ross, Nova Scotia. It is about an hour's drive from Halifax.

== Museum ==
The exhibits feature working artisans, live animals, historic buildings, and antique implements and furnishings. The goal of the Ross Farm Museum is to give visitors an understanding of the importance of Nova Scotia's rural heritage. It includes a country store displaying the types of products available then, a working cooper shop, historic breeds of farm animals, a blacksmith, a working farm, and a village school house. Costumed guides are on hand to explain life in that time period. Wagon rides are often available. Ross Farm is a member of the Nova Scotia Museum network.

== History ==
After the War of 1812, the village of Sherbrook (renamed New Ross) and the Ross Farm were established by William Ross (1783–1822) in 1816. William Ross was originally from Cork, Ireland. During the Napoleonic Wars, he became part of the British Army 16th Regiment of Foot and stationed in Fort Amsterdam, Surinam. His wife Mary accompanied him. They had their second child while they were there. During their return to Britain, they survived their ship being wrecked on the Tuskar Rock off the coast of Wexford, Ireland.

William and Mary moved to Sunderland, England, where their son Edward Ross (1813–1894) was born, the author of the diaries on which the museum is based. During the War of 1812, as a soldier in the 16th Regiment, William Ross and his family moved to British North America and were stationed at Fort Coteau-du-Lac, Quebec. The Battle of the Chateauguay happened while he was there. His role in the battle is unknown. Lieutenant William Ross chose to transfer to the Nova Scotia Fencibles Infantry while in Quebec.

After the war, upon their return to Nova Scotia, the Ross family again survived the sinking of the Archduke Charles off the coast of Green Island (Jeddore Ledges, Nova Scotia). Capt. Ross arrived in Halifax where he and his family were hosted by John Lawson, Esquire. In gratitude to their host, Capt. Ross named the lake below the settlement Lawson Lake after his Haligonian host.

The Fencibles were disbanded on 25 July 1816. Two weeks later, on 7 August 1816, William Ross led 172 former soldiers who were given land grants along the newly burned road between Chester and Kentville, Nova Scotia. Six years later on 2 May 1822, William Ross died suddenly at the age of 39 and was buried in the Old Burying Ground (Halifax, Nova Scotia). Four months later, his wife Mary gave birth to their fourth child.

William's son Edward Ross kept a diary for most of his life. The Ross Farm Museum is based on the diaries Edward wrote when he was a young man age 22–28 (1835–1841). During this time on the farm, he sold produce from the local community in his store and also made a trip by boat from Chester to Halifax every spring. He was also a justice of the peace. At age 28, Edward left the community and married Marie three years later at Cornwallis, Nova Scotia (1844). At age 52, Edward spent time in jail for not being able to pay his debts (1865). Five years later he went to Boston in search of work. While there, he heard the famous Lucy Stone speak at the Massachusetts State House (1872). They returned to Kentville, Nova Scotia until Marie died (1882). Edward lived for twelve more years. He eventually moved back to the Ross Farm and lived on the farm for the last three years of his life. He died at age 81 (1894).

== Affiliations ==
The Museum is affiliated with the Canadian Museums Association (CMA), Canadian Heritage Information Network (CHIN), The Association for Living History, Farm and Agricultural Museums (ALHFAM), and the Virtual Museum of Canada.

== See also ==
- Agriculture in Canada
- Canada Agriculture Museum
- Central Experimental Farm
- Manitoba Agricultural Museum
- Ontario Agricultural Museum
