= Manitoba Agricultural Museum =

Agricultural museum in Manitoba, Canada

Coordinates: 49.9253°N 98.9501°W

- Location: Austin, Manitoba, Canada.
- Type: Agricultural Museum
- Website: http://mbagmuseum.ca/

The Manitoba Agricultural Museum is dedicated to collecting vintage farm machinery and buildings from 1900 and before. Located on 50 acres (200,000 m^{2}) near Austin, Manitoba in the Municipality of North Norfolk, to date they have amassed over 500 pieces of machinery and a pioneer village consisting of more than 20 buildings complete with artifacts. This is Canada's largest collection of vintage equipment. The facilities include a camping and picnic grounds and a souvenir shop.

Throughout the year the museum offers various tours, schools and hands on experiences climaxing with Annual Manitoba Threshermen's Reunion and Stampede and various other expositions. The annual Threshermen's Reunion and Stampede is held near the end of July.

== Attractions ==
The Threshermen's Reunion offers a large collection of antique steam and gas tractors as well as the other equipment that was used on early farms. Every afternoon during the reunion a parade showcases some 12 steam engines and dozens of "gas" tractors and machinery. After the parade venture into the fair grounds and watch an early steam powered saw mill blaze through logs to make planks that were the foundation of pioneer buildings. At supper time, the Corn and Barley Corral features a steam tractor steaming corn. Every evening there is a rodeo followed by a free dance.

The Manitoba Amateur Radio Museum is also located on the grounds. This museum is dedicated to collecting, restoring and operation antique communication equipment and now has over 3700 artifacts on display. Its operating call signs are VE4ARM and VE4MTR.

== Gallery ==
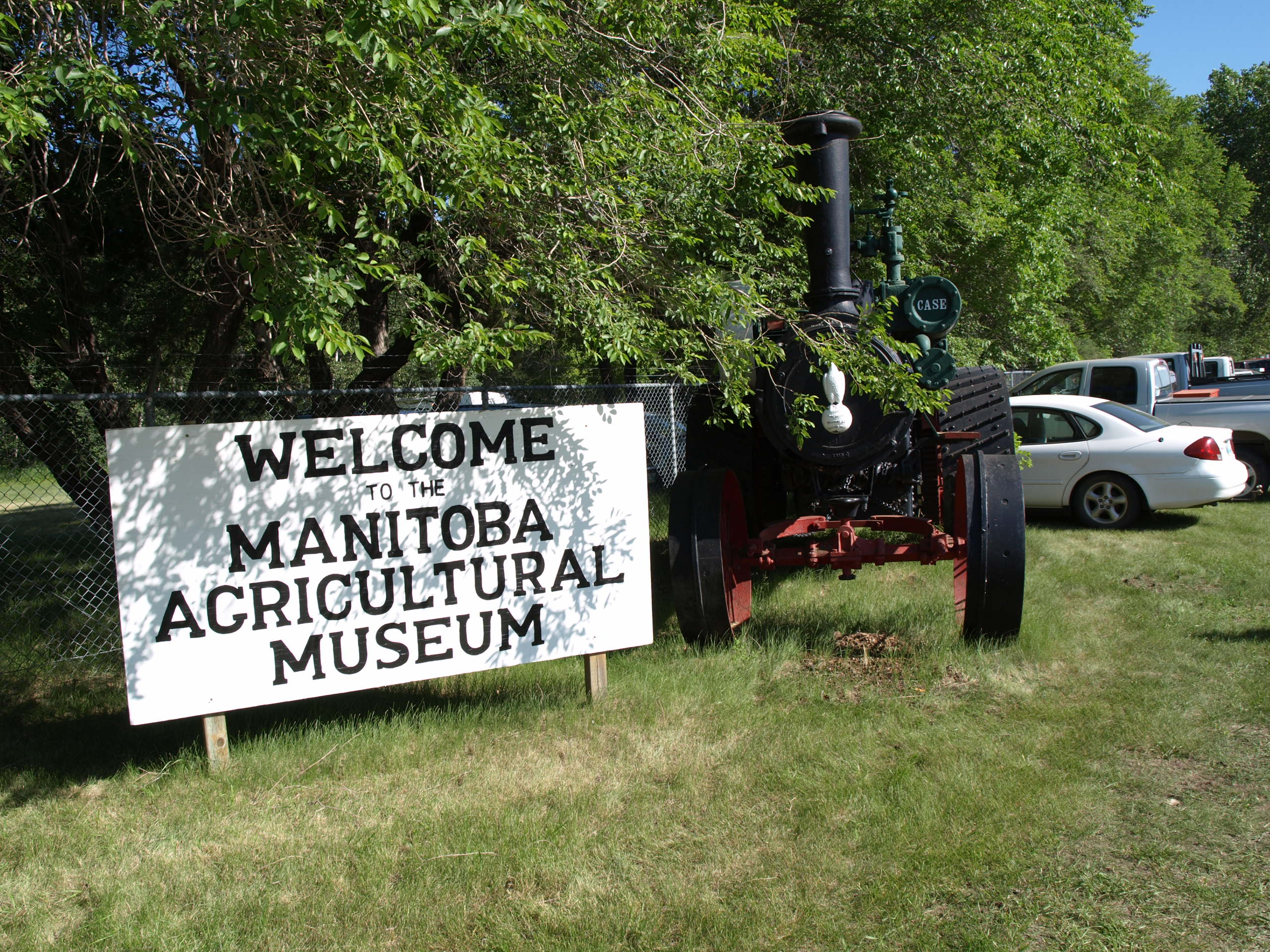

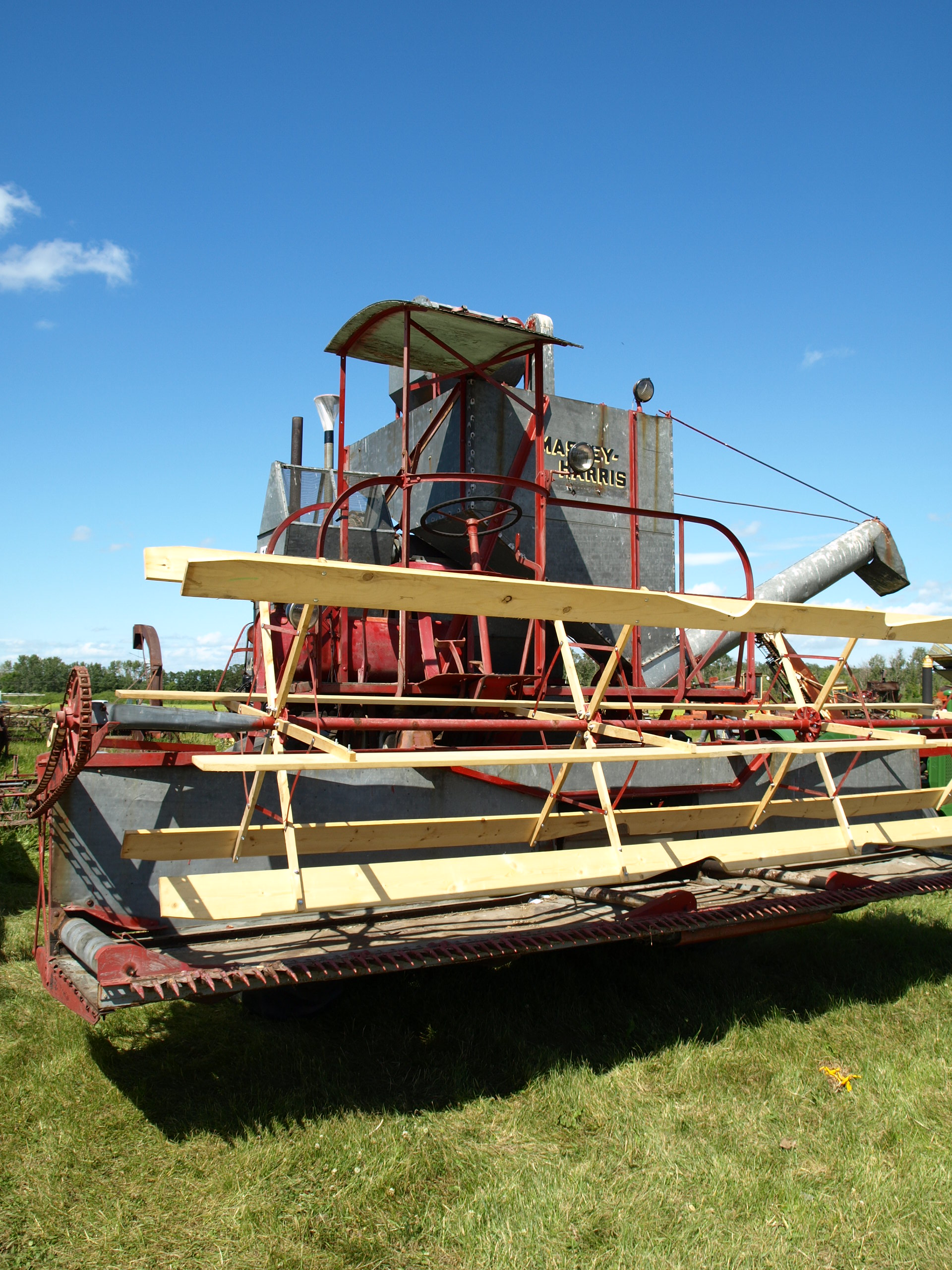

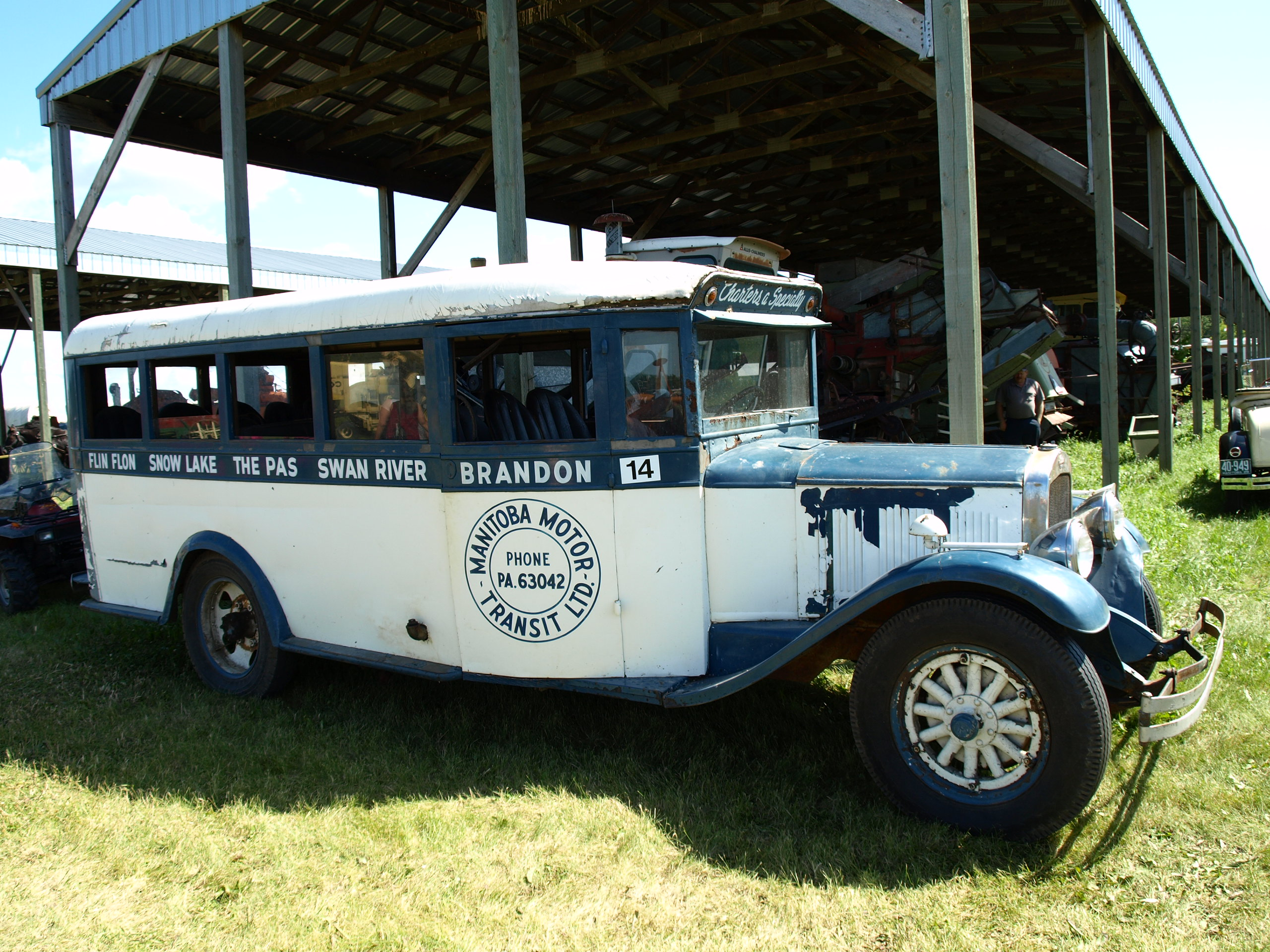

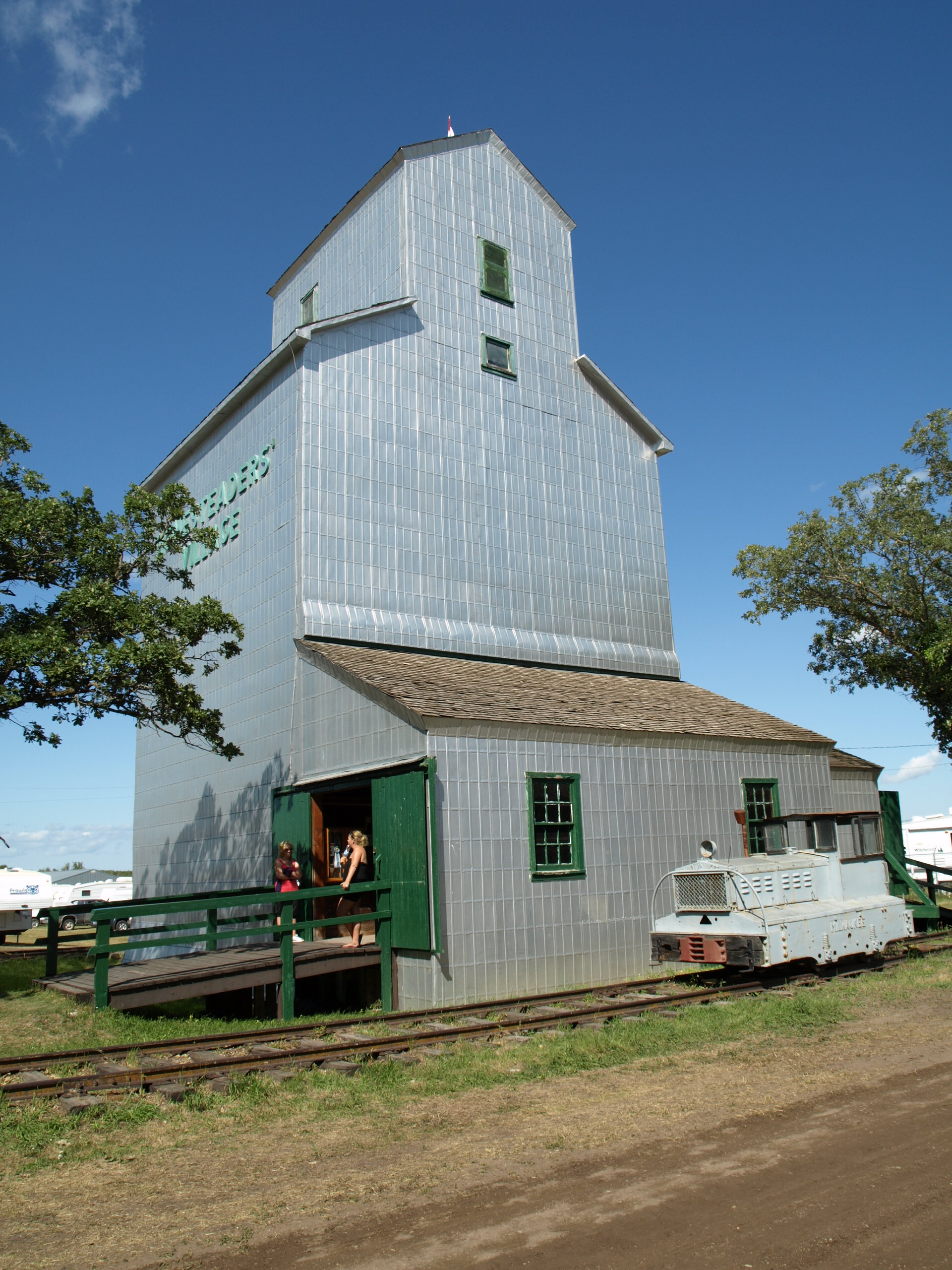

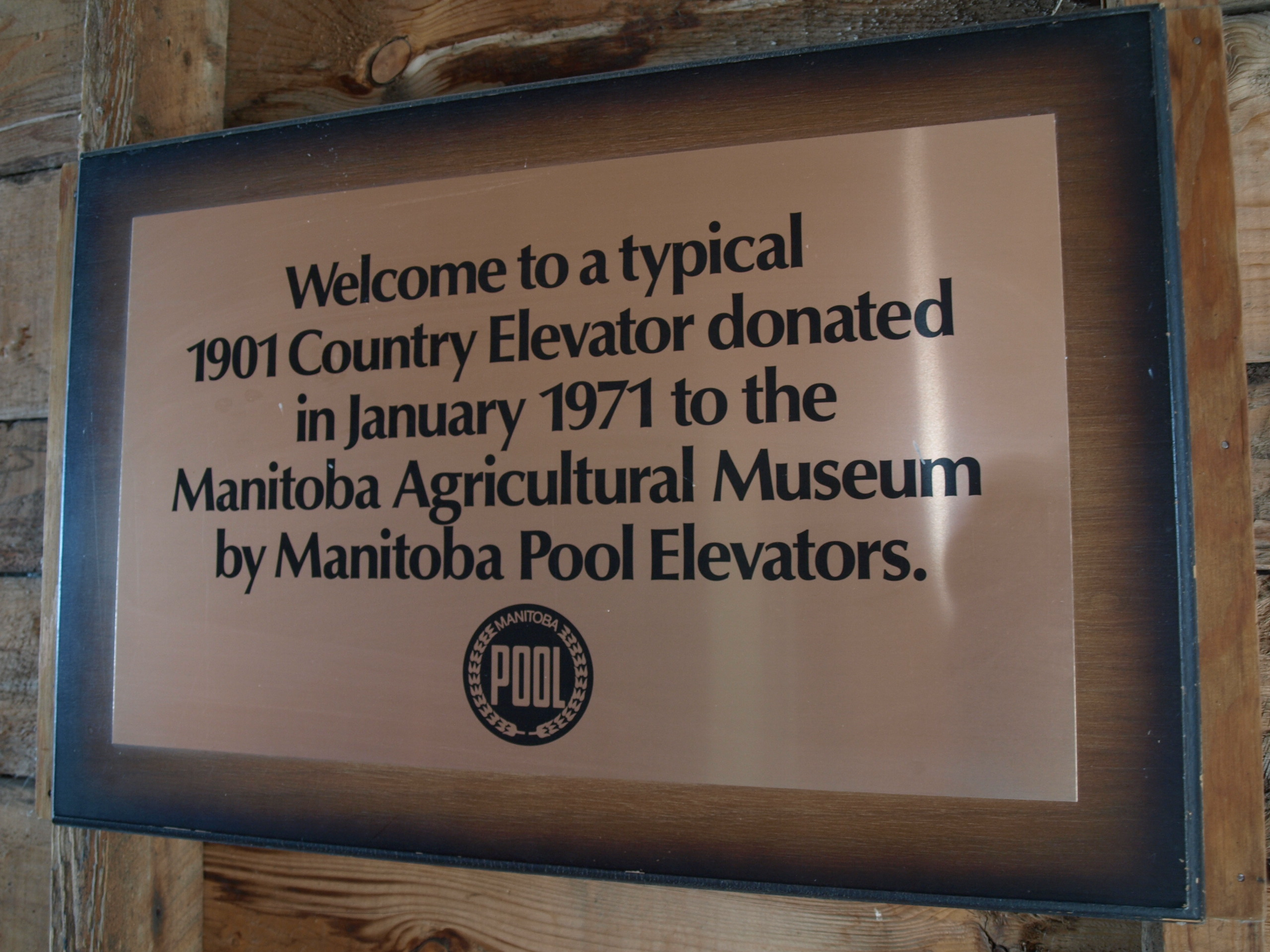

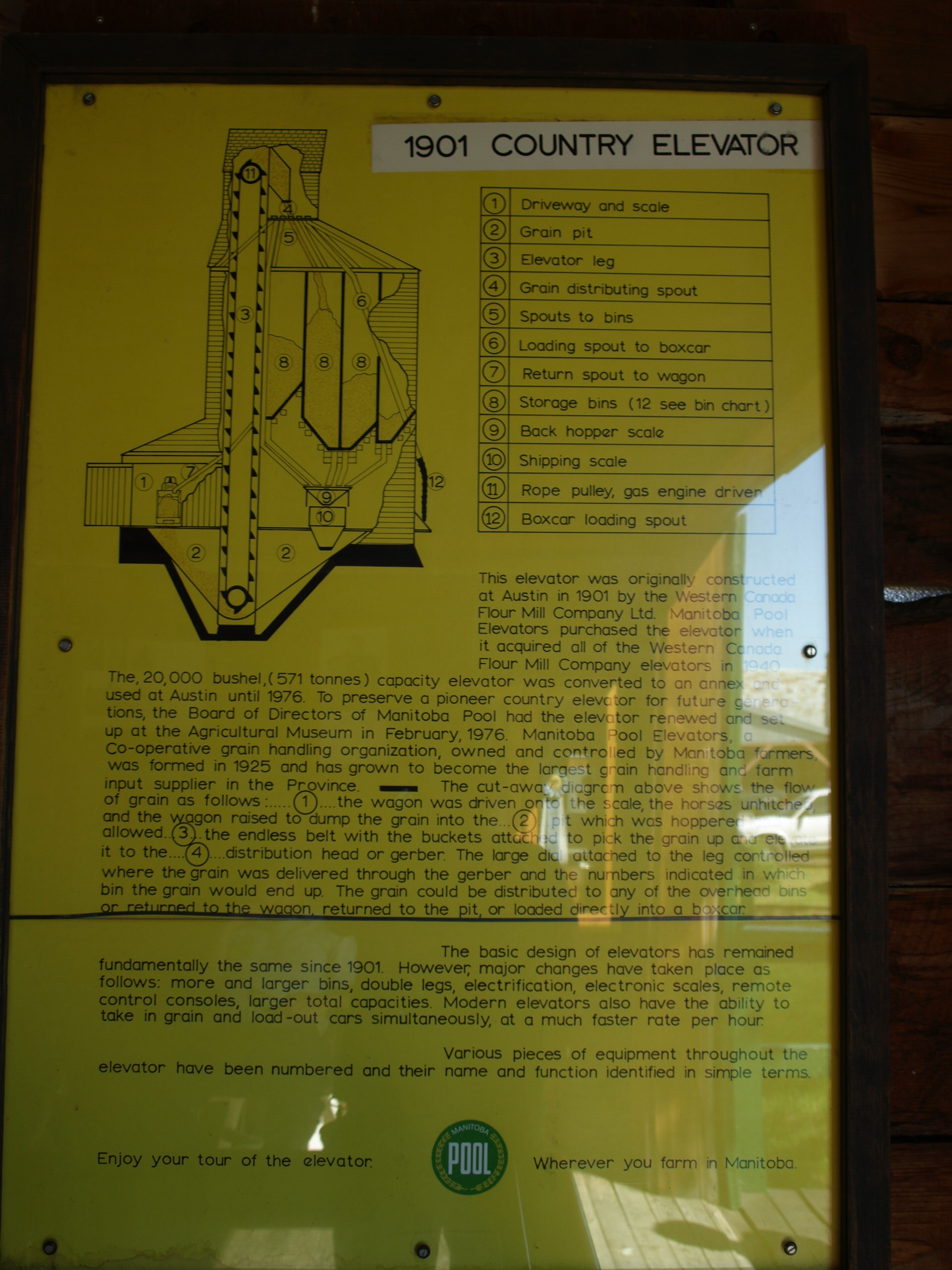

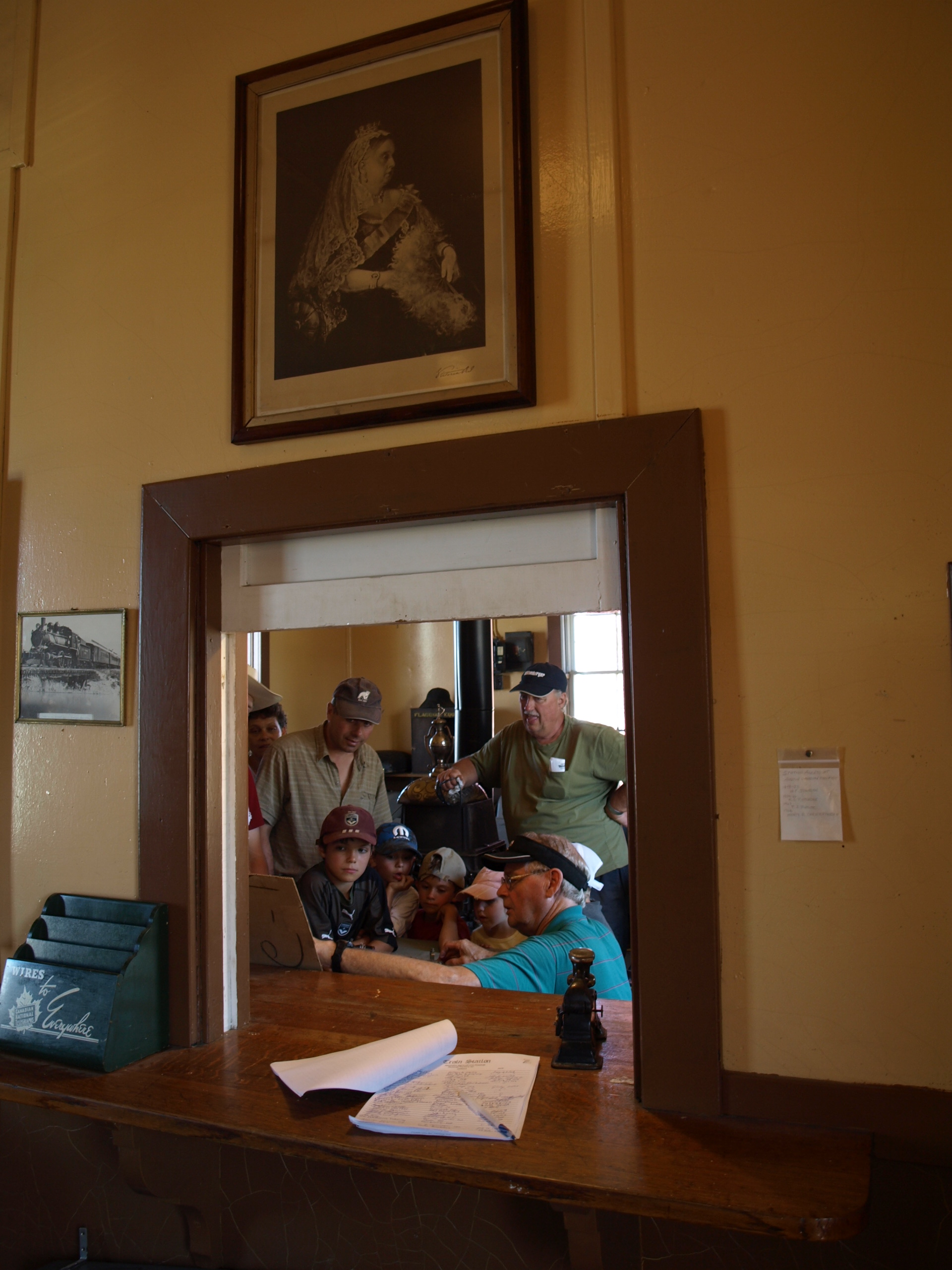

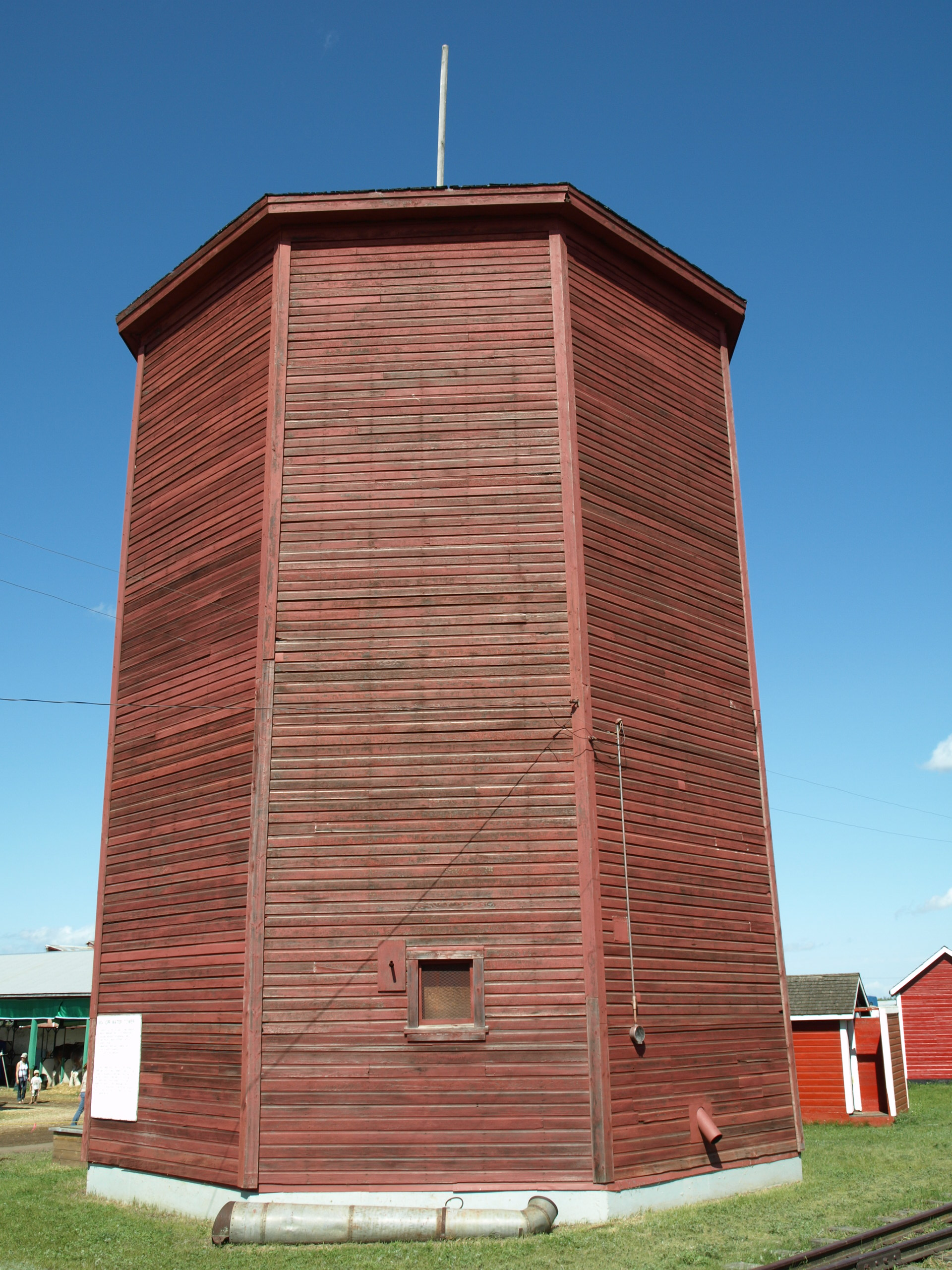

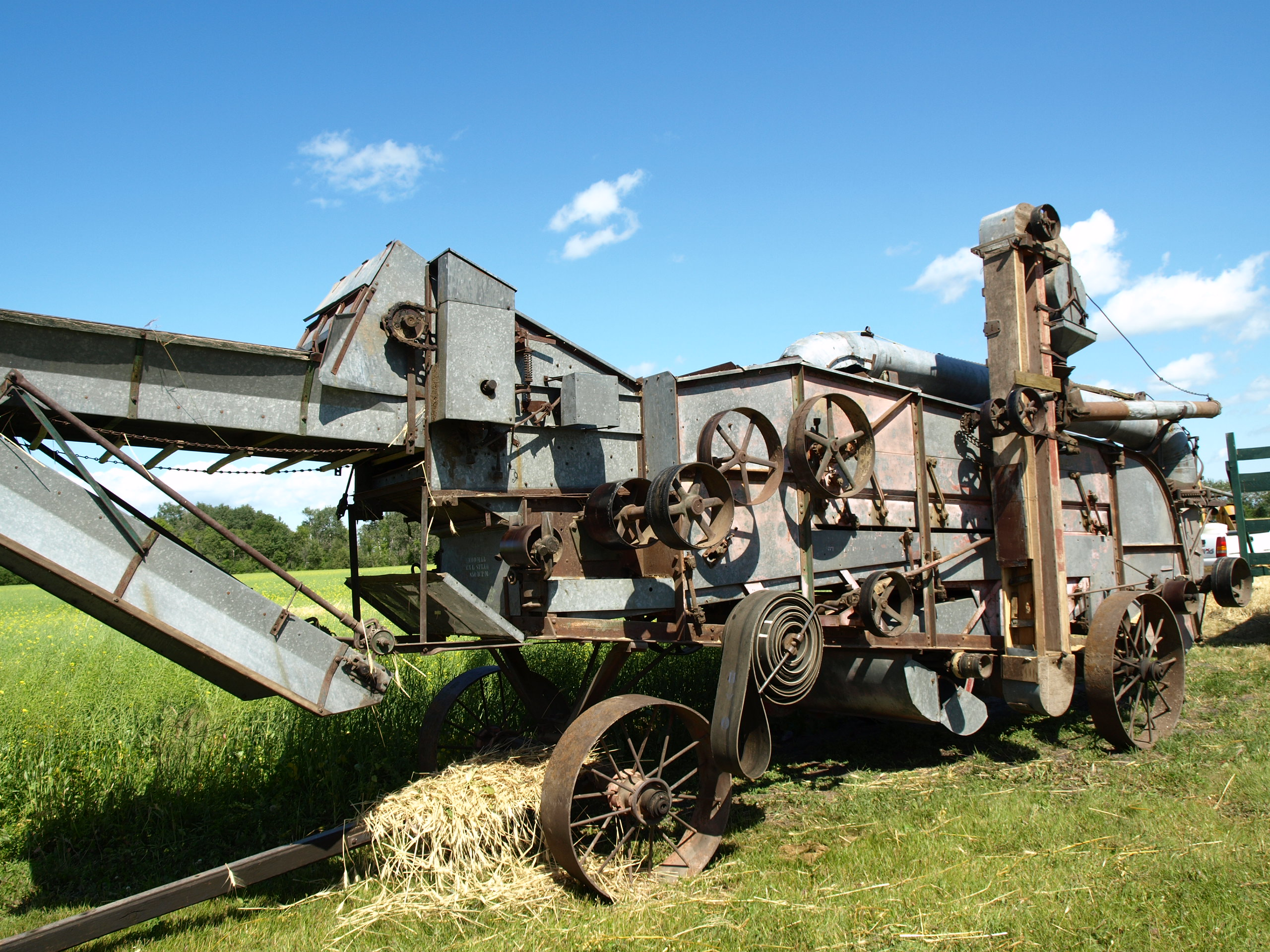

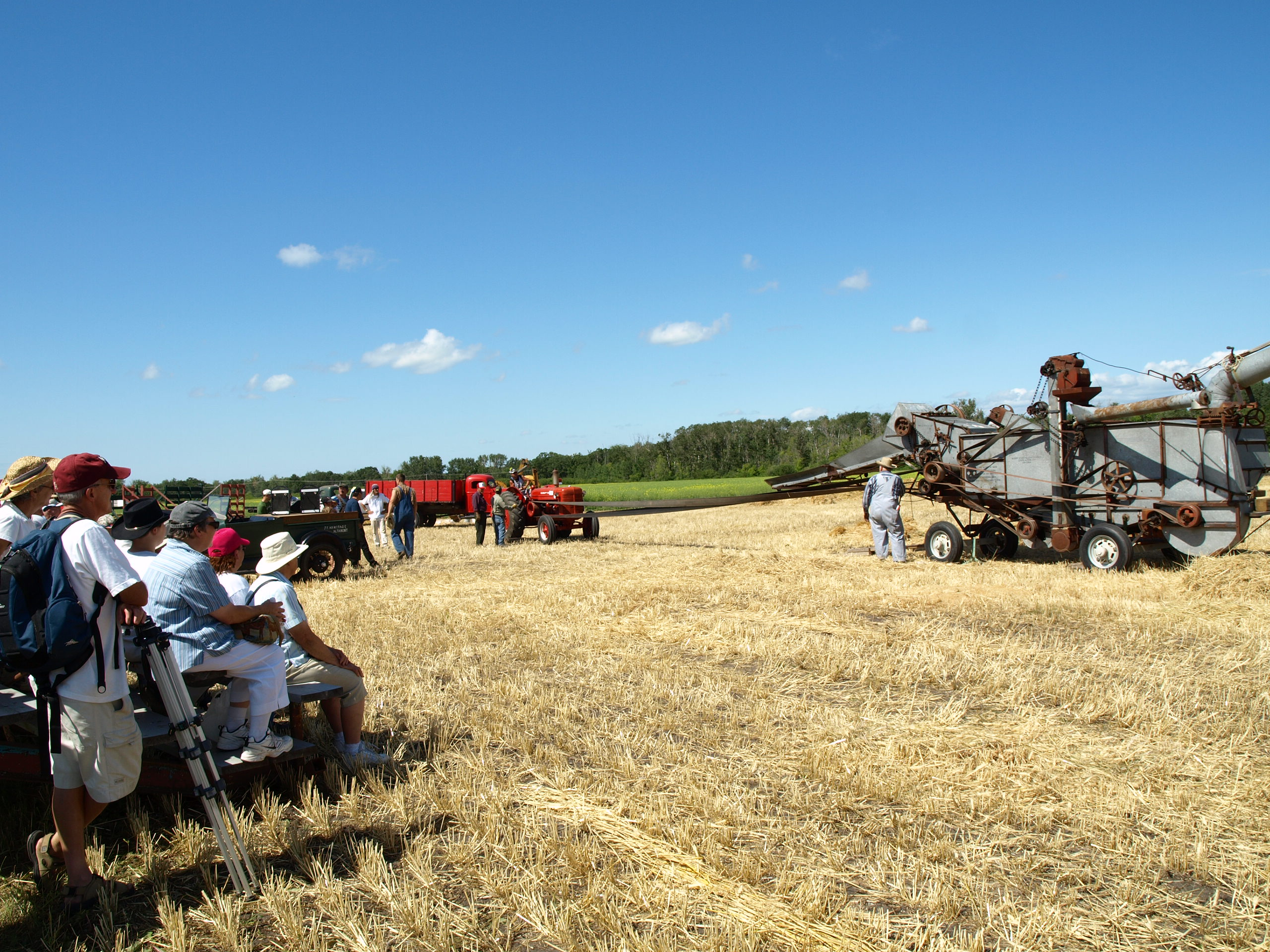

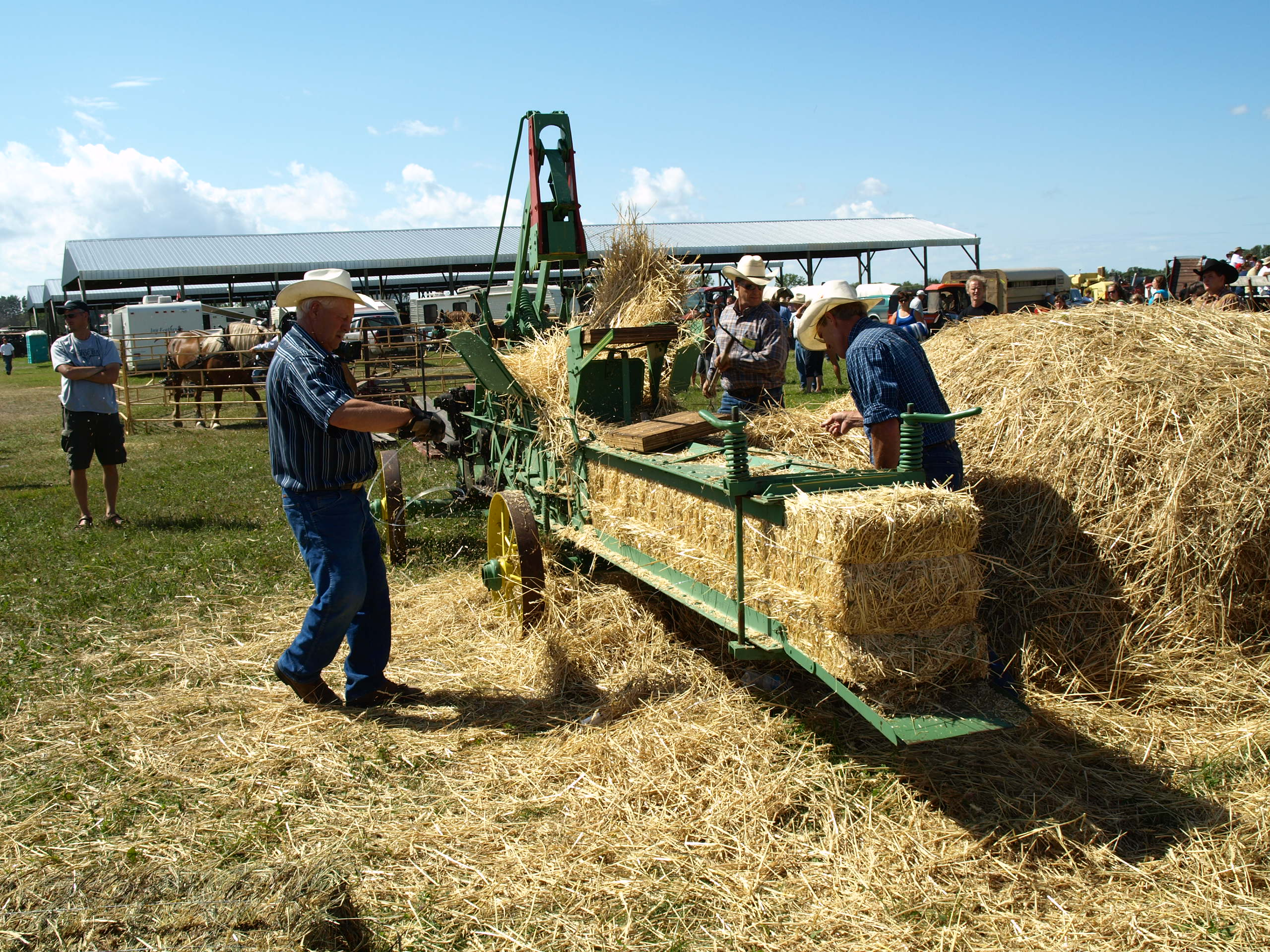

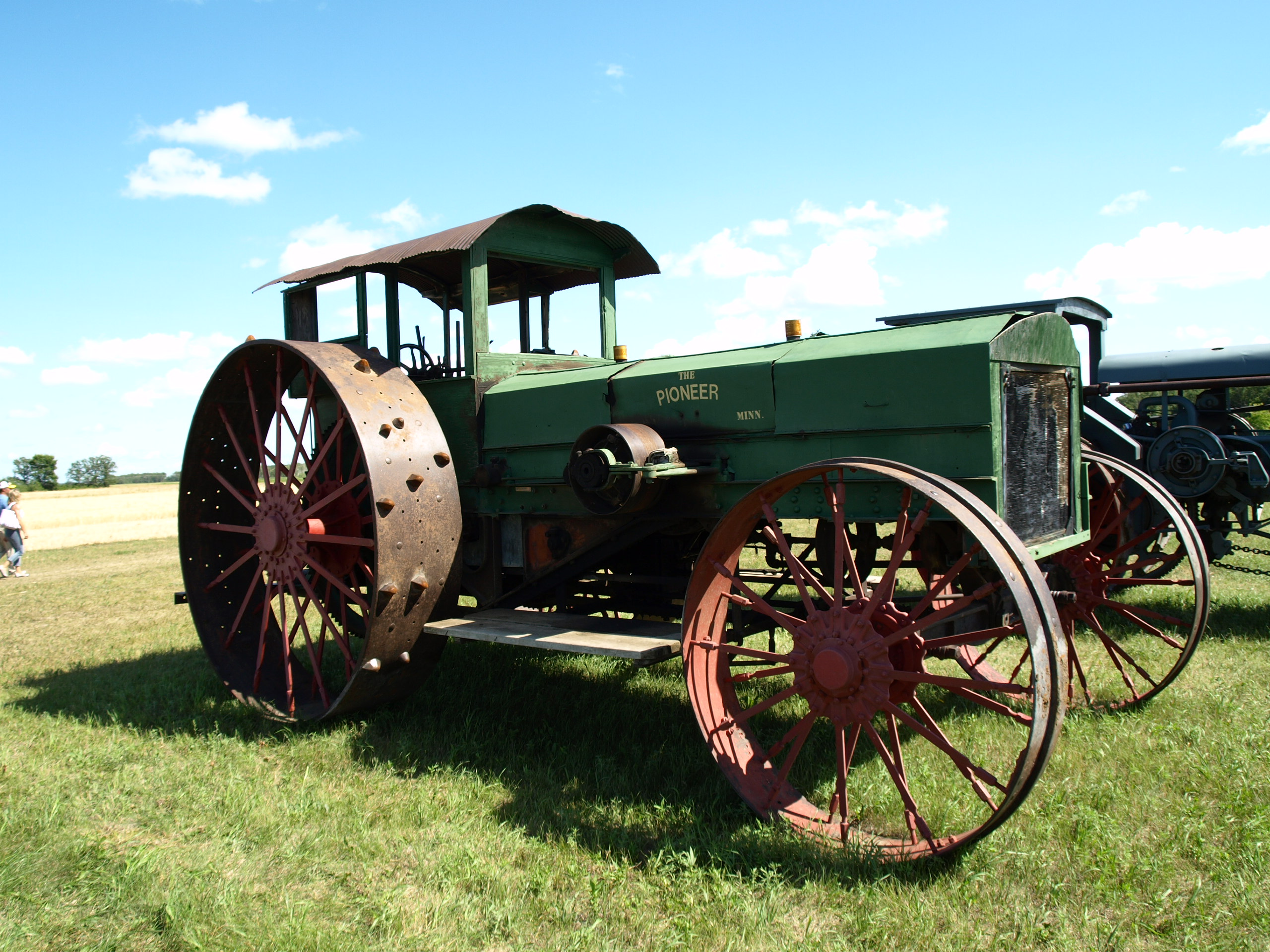

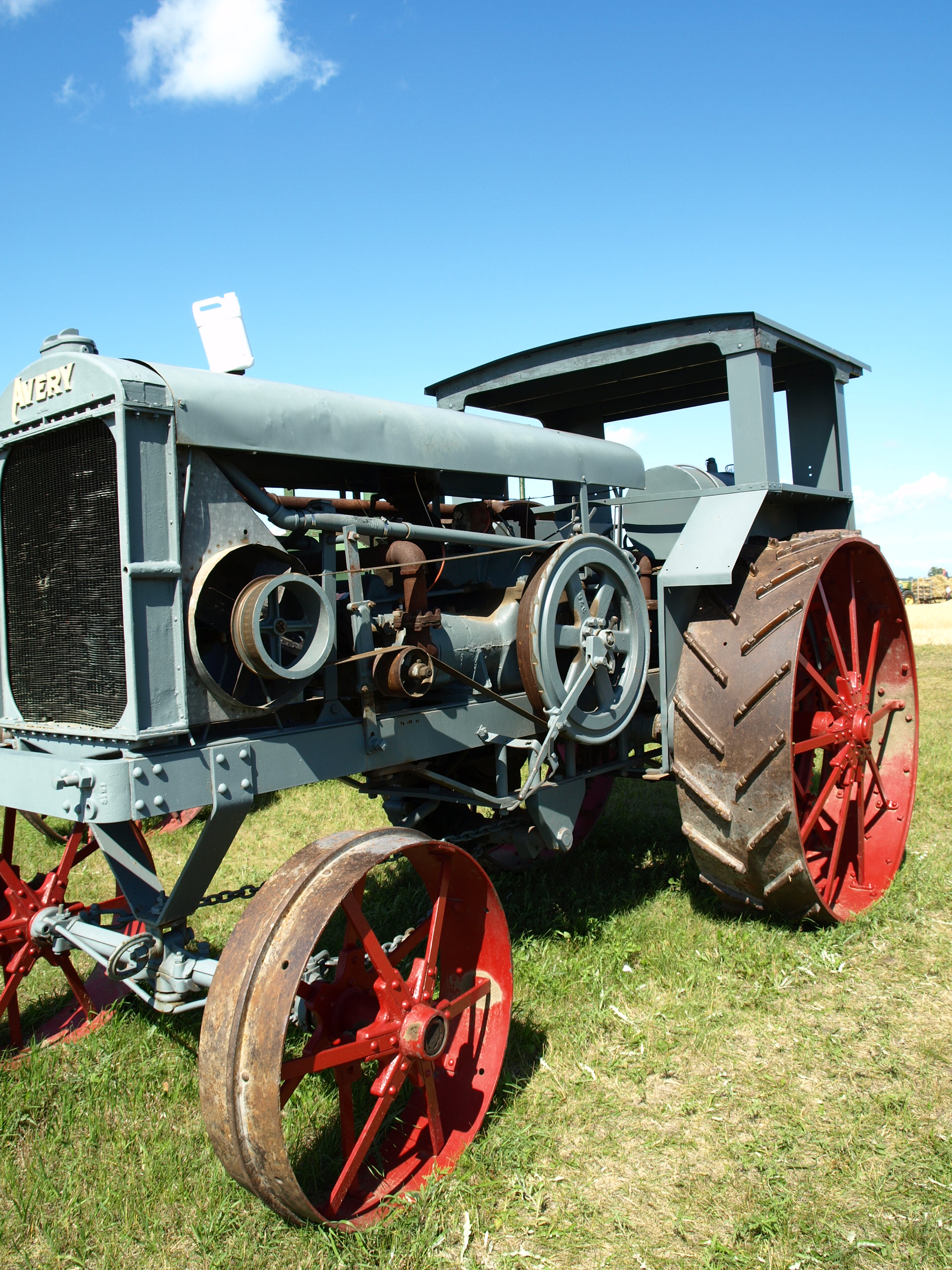

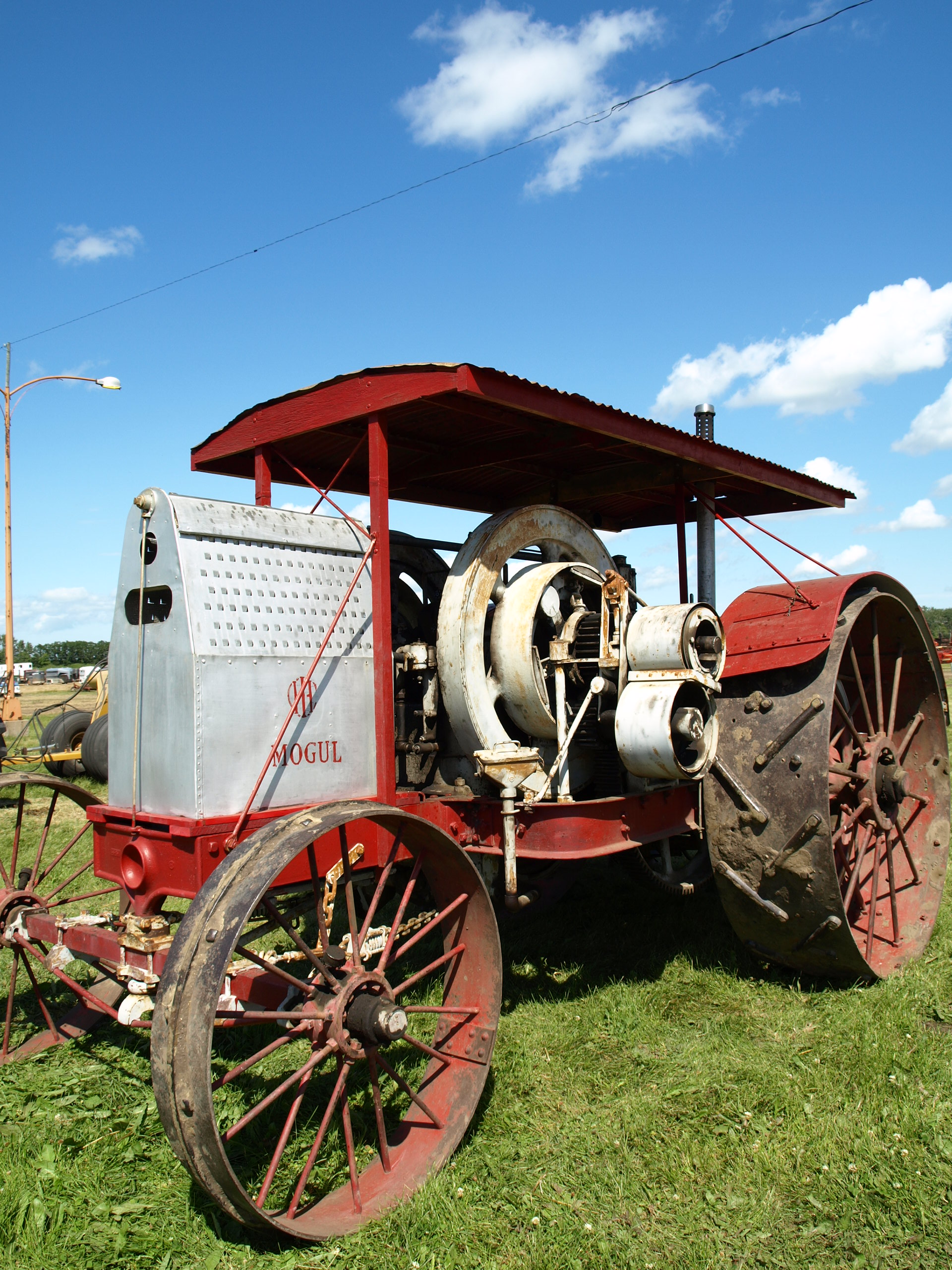

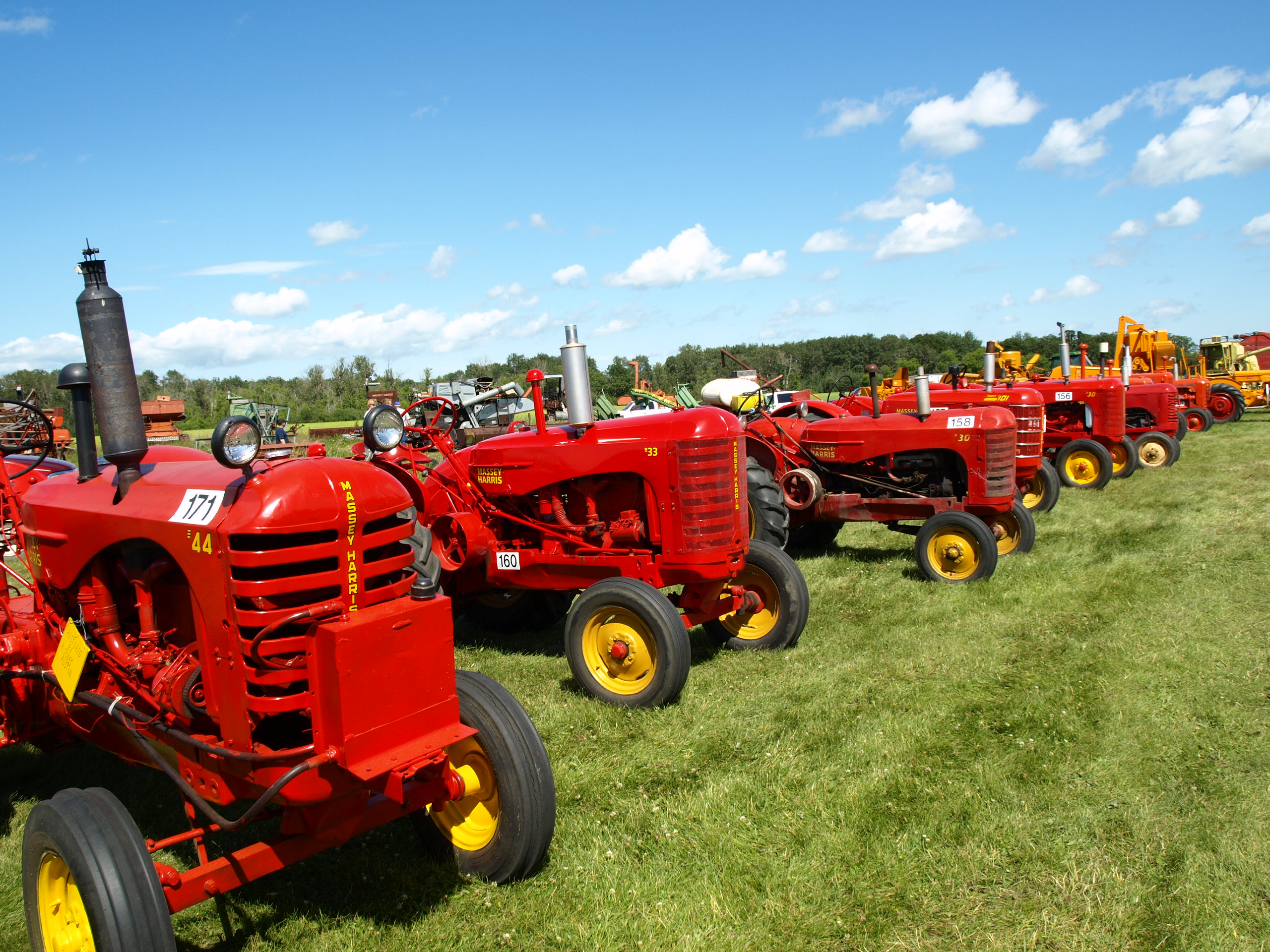

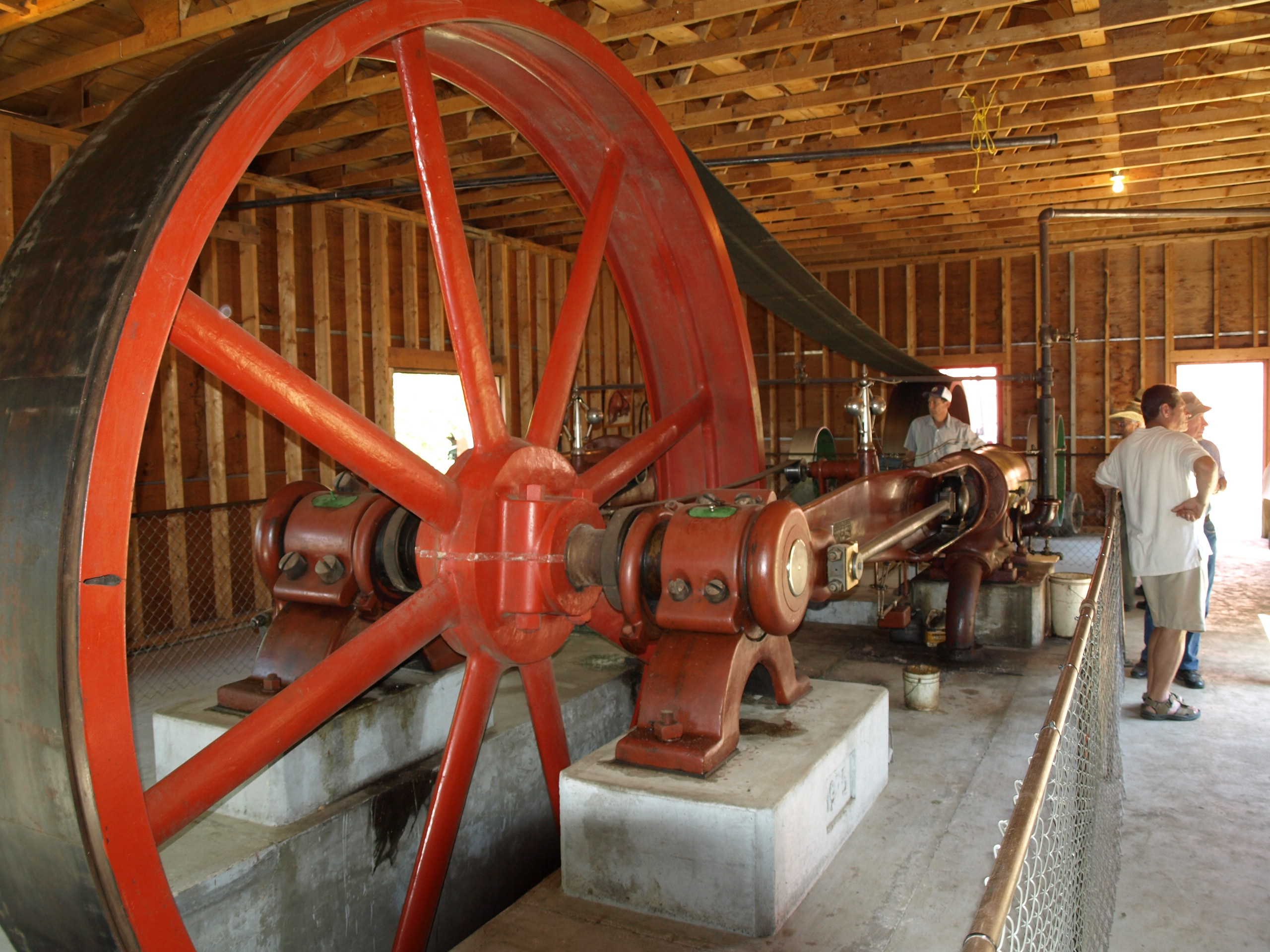

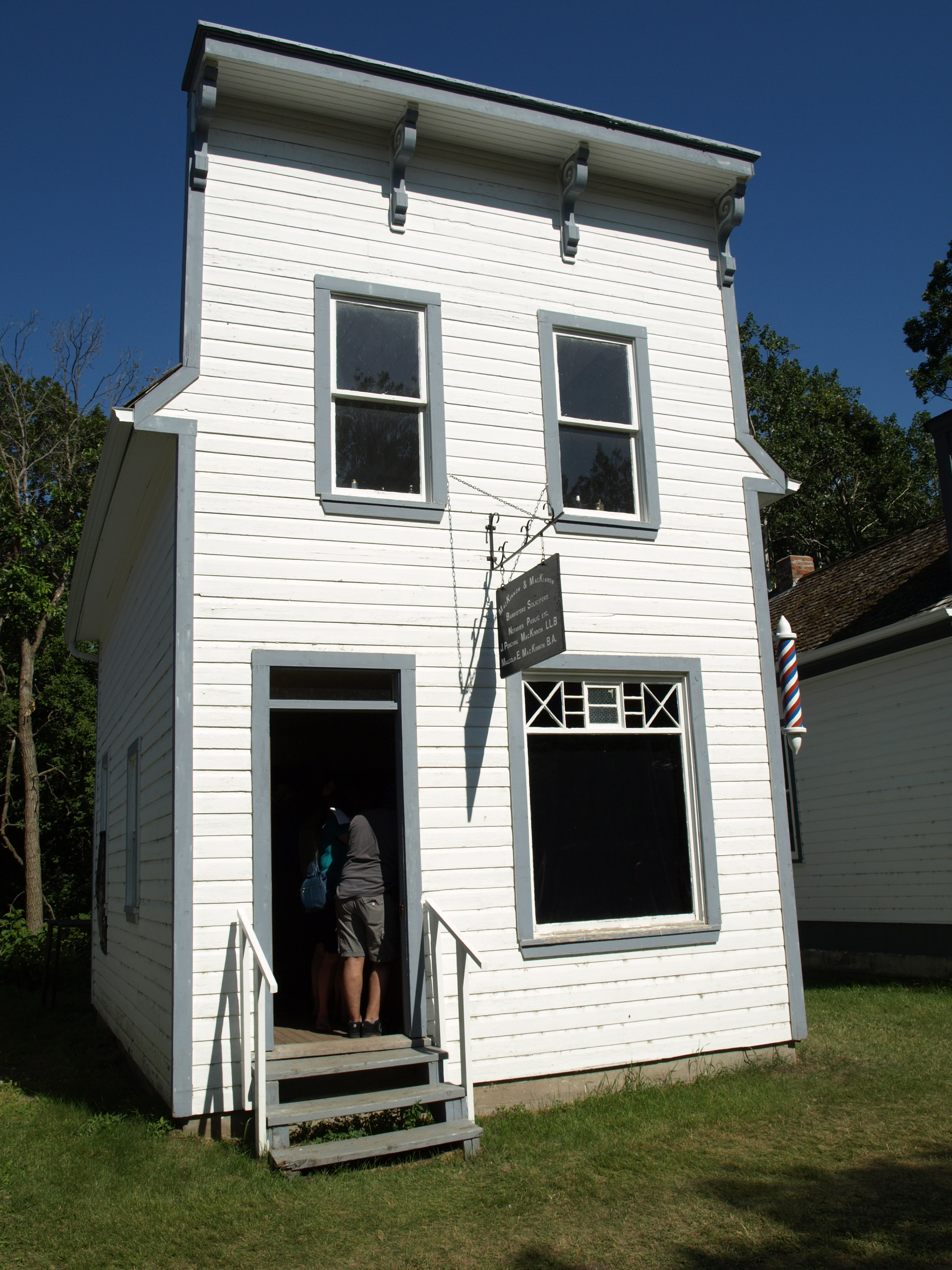

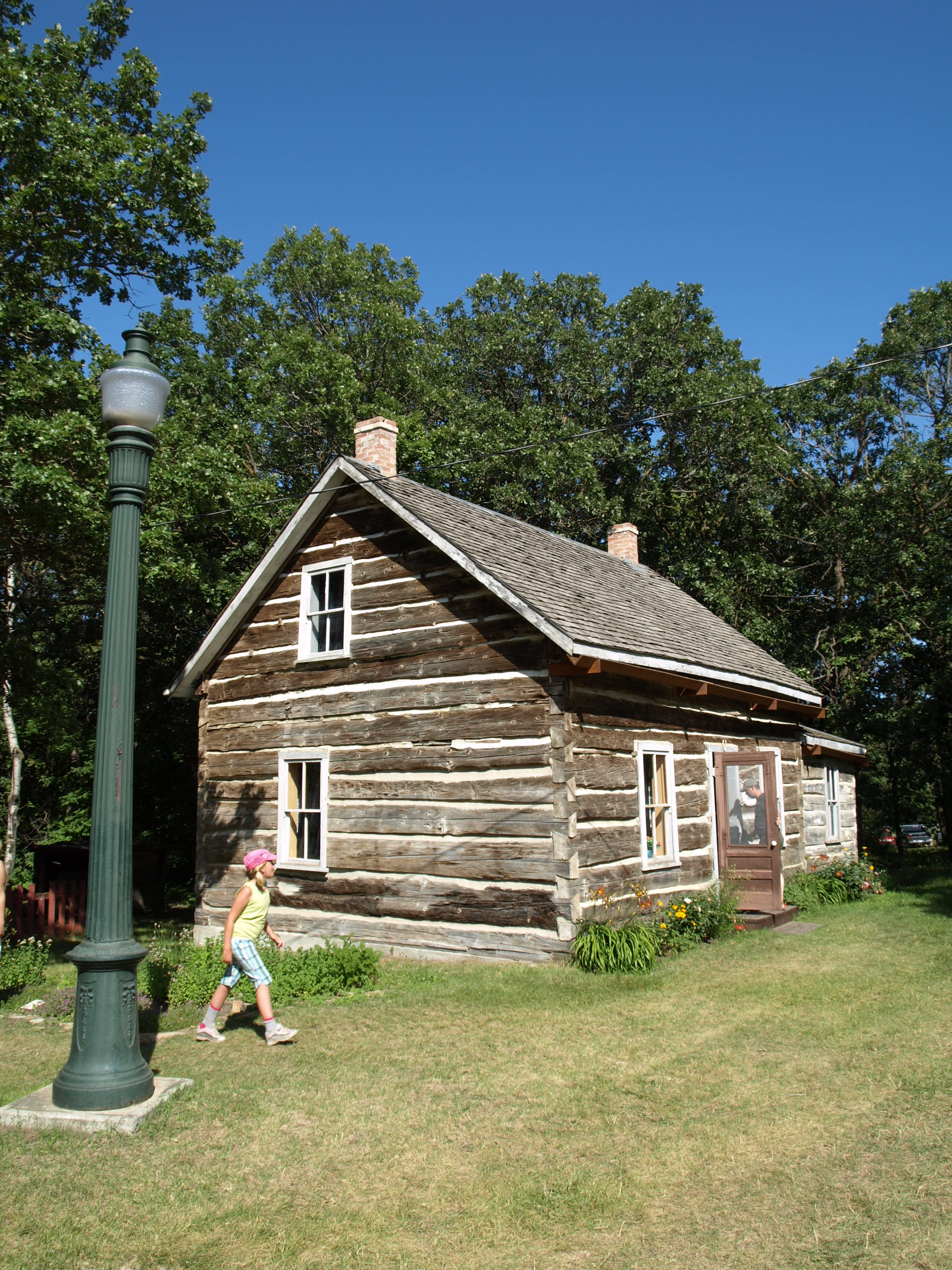

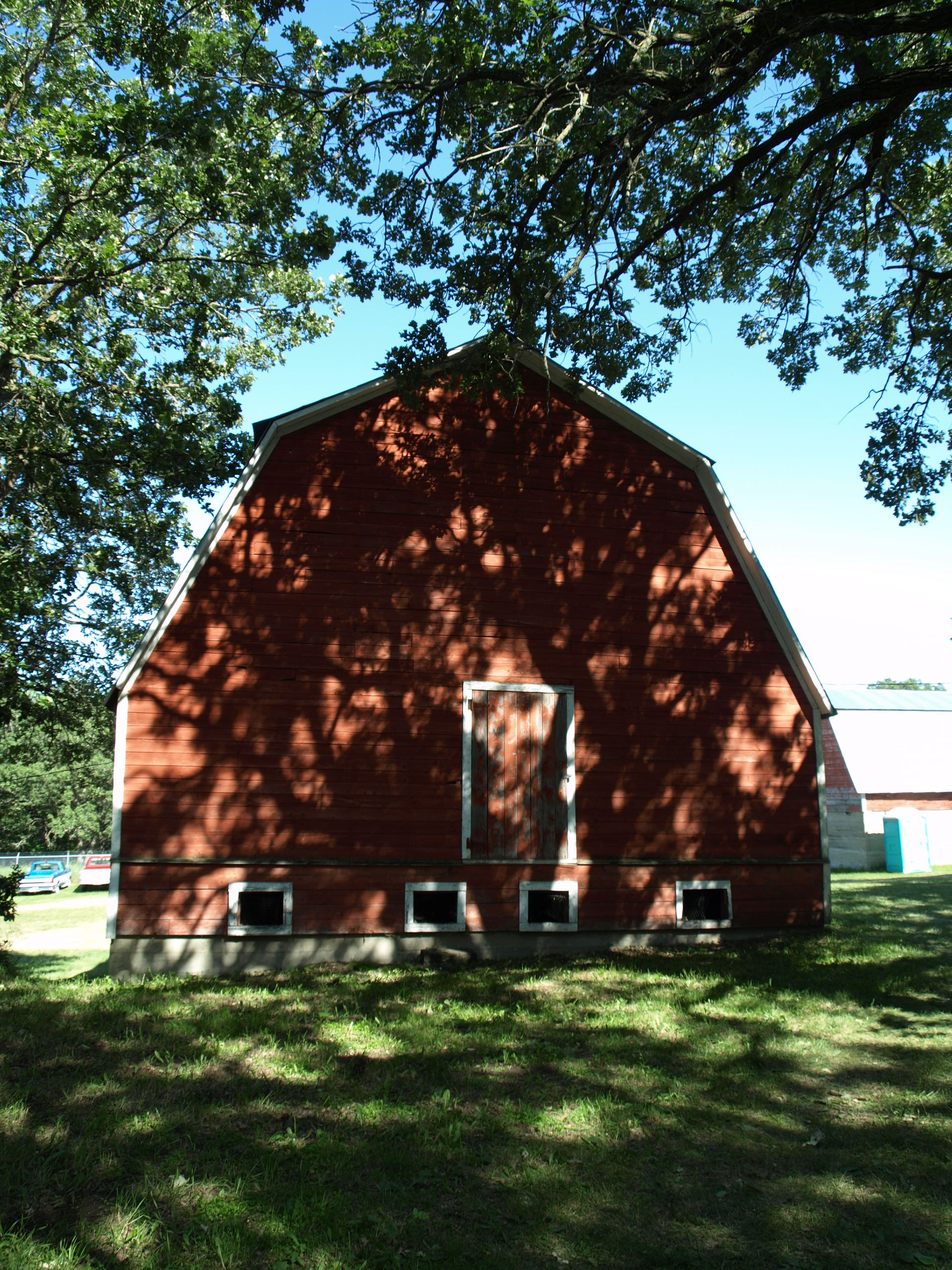

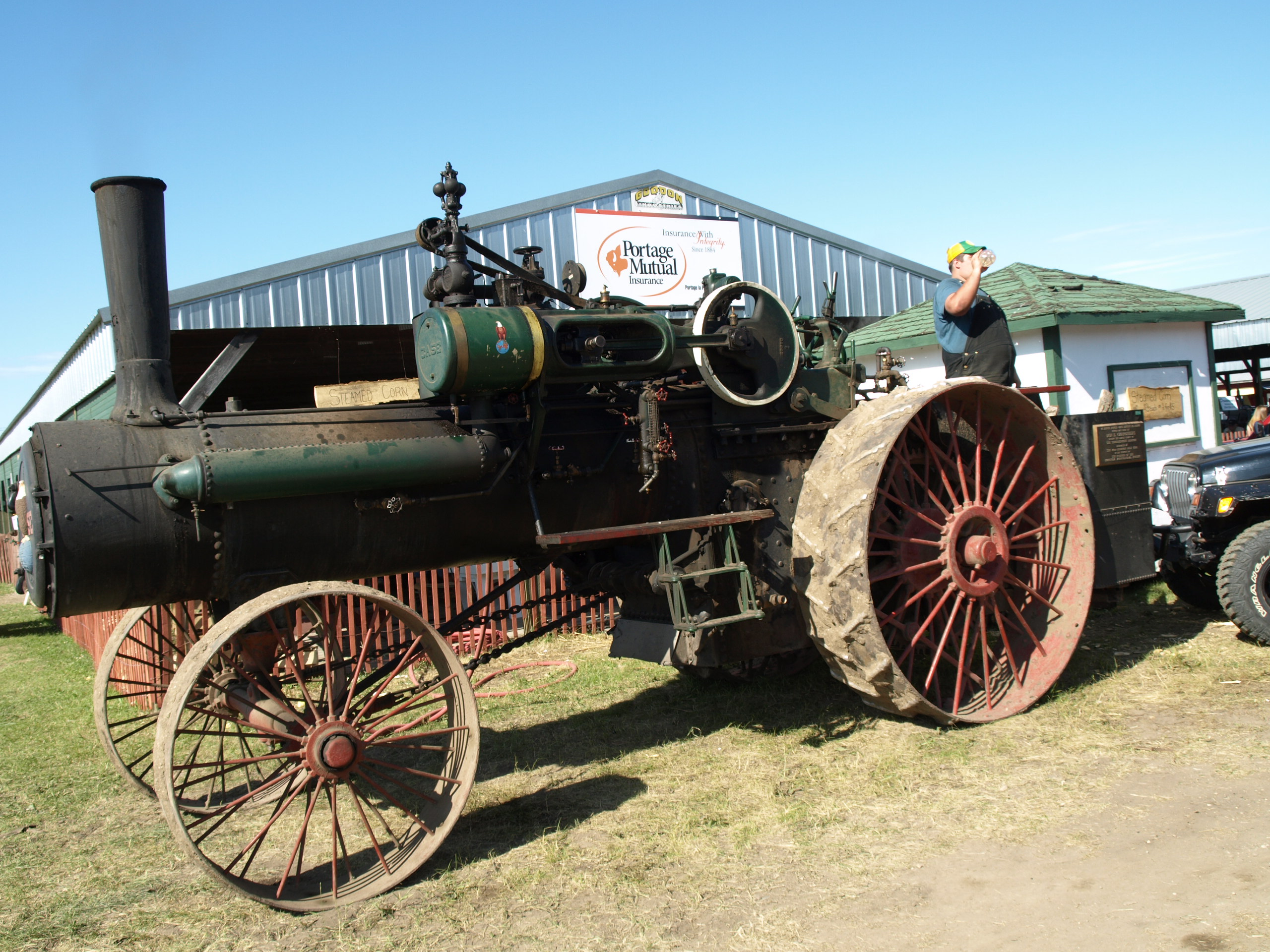

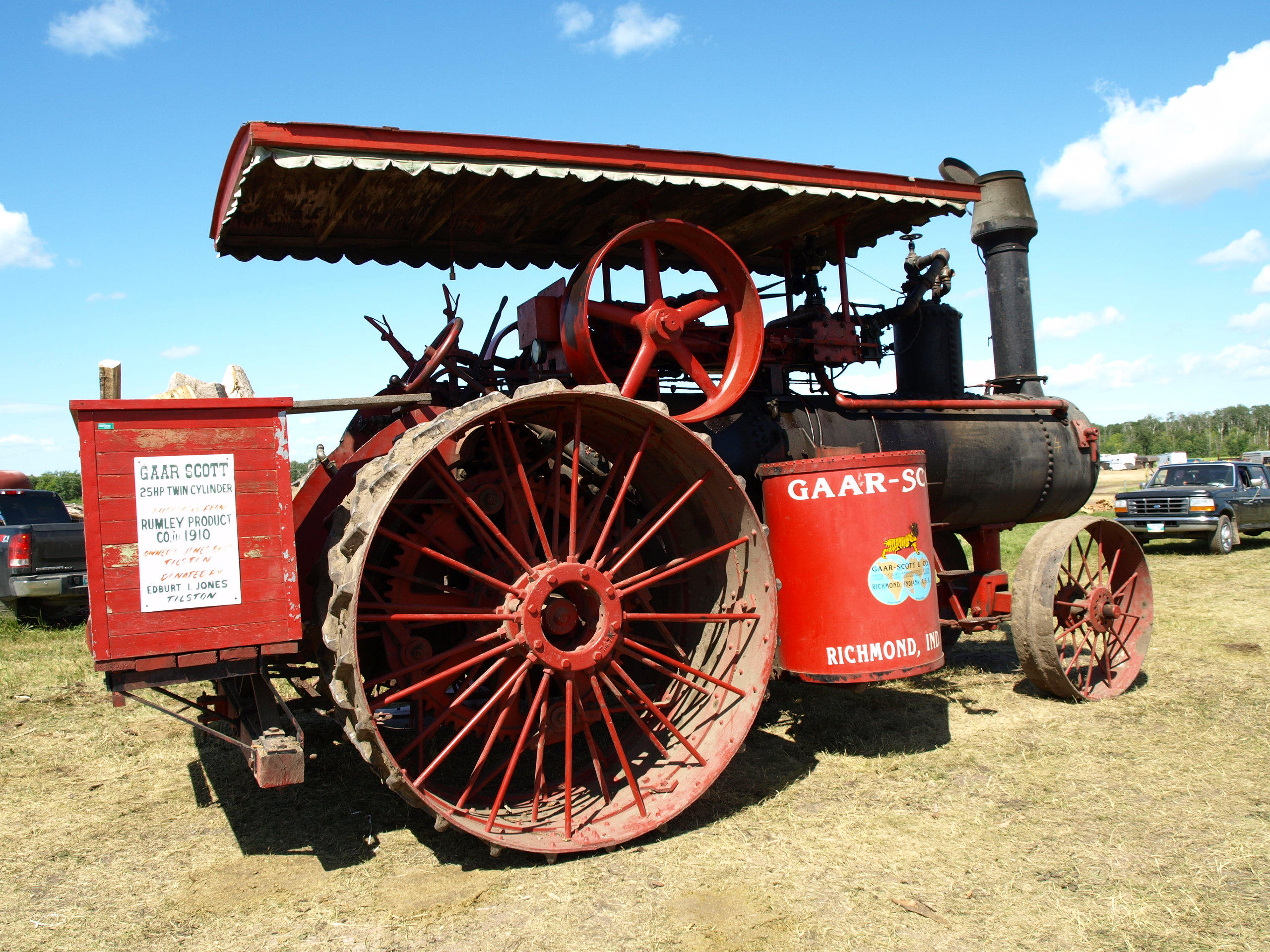

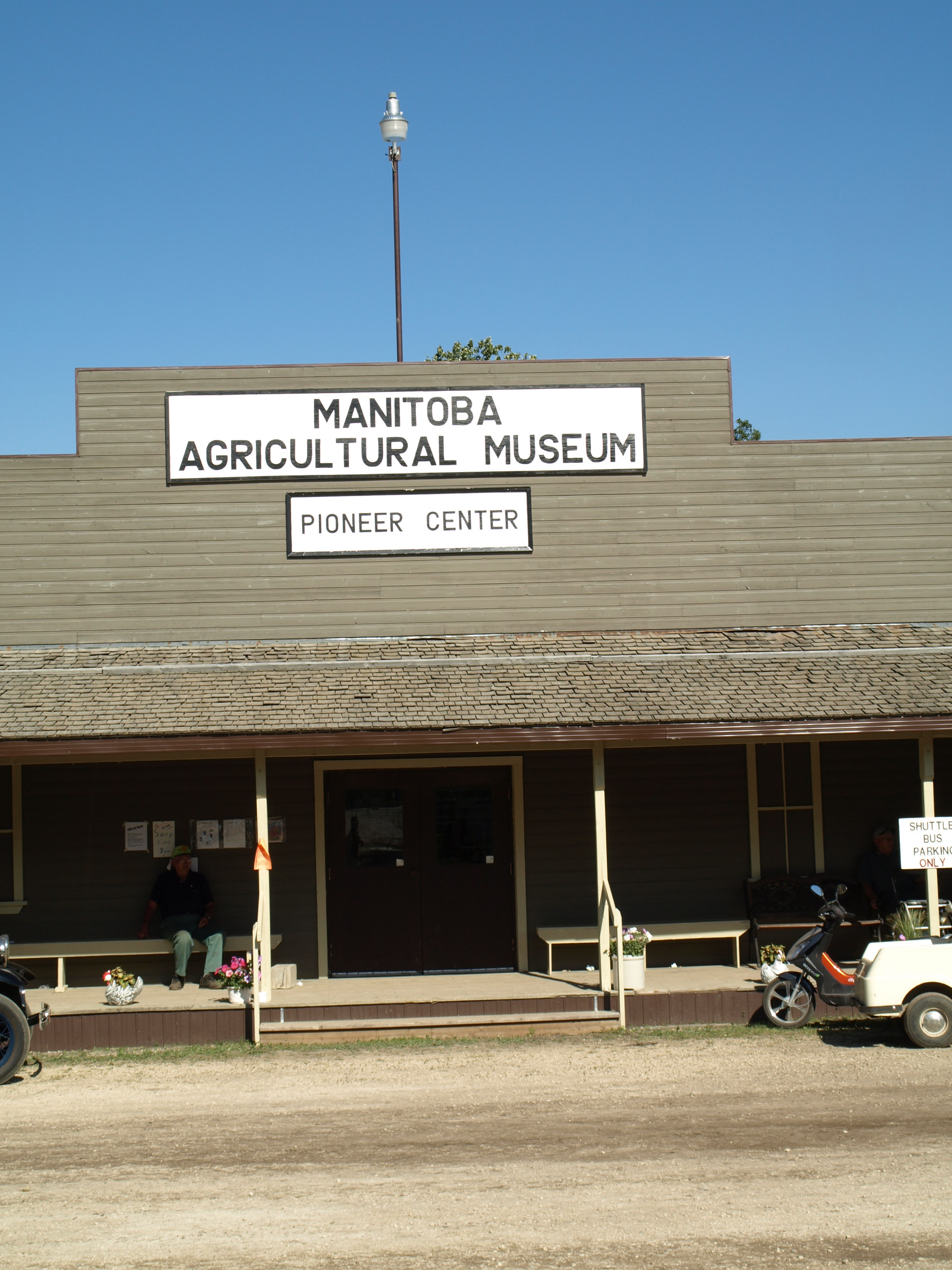

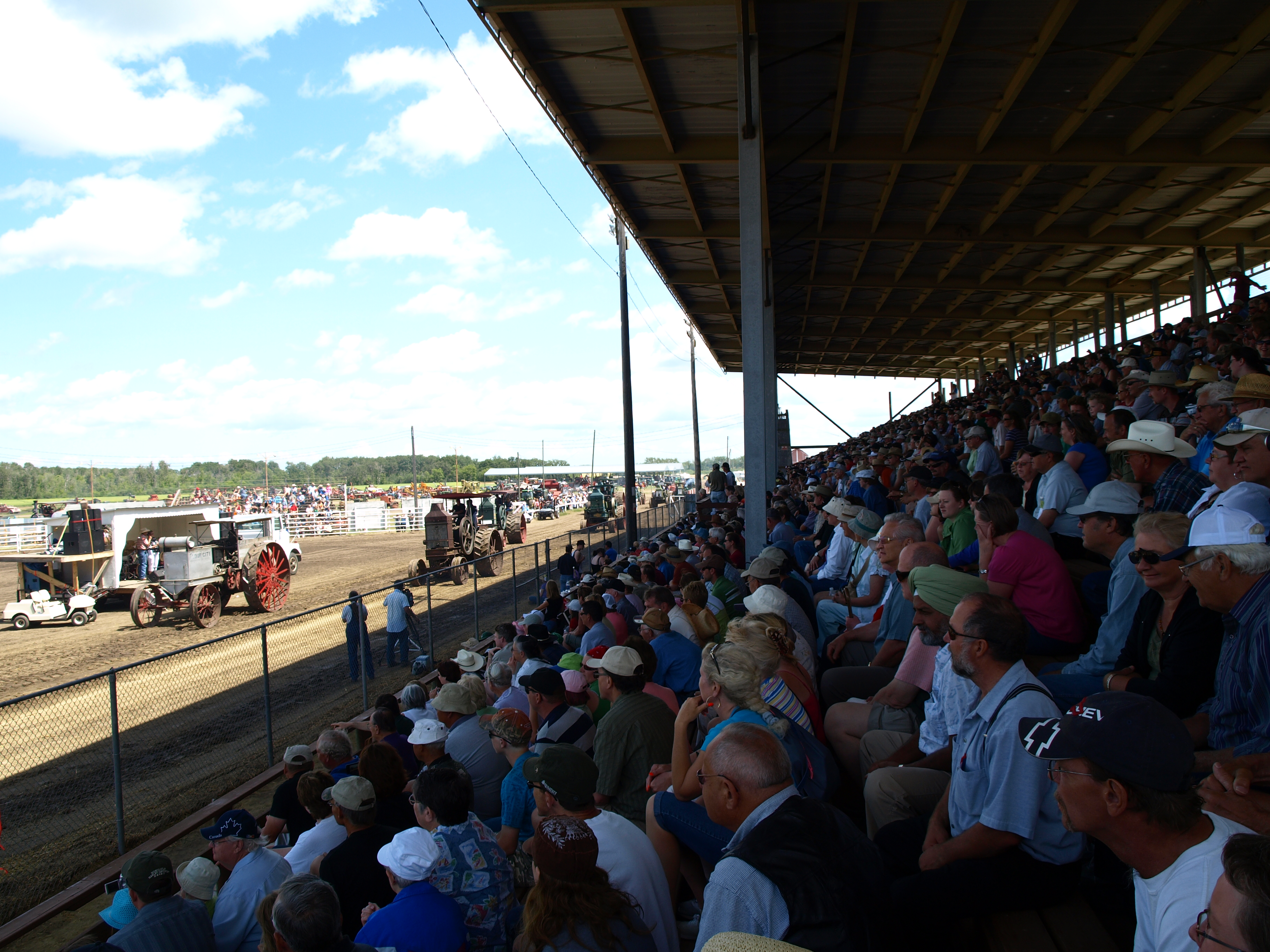
Thresherman's Reunion 2009

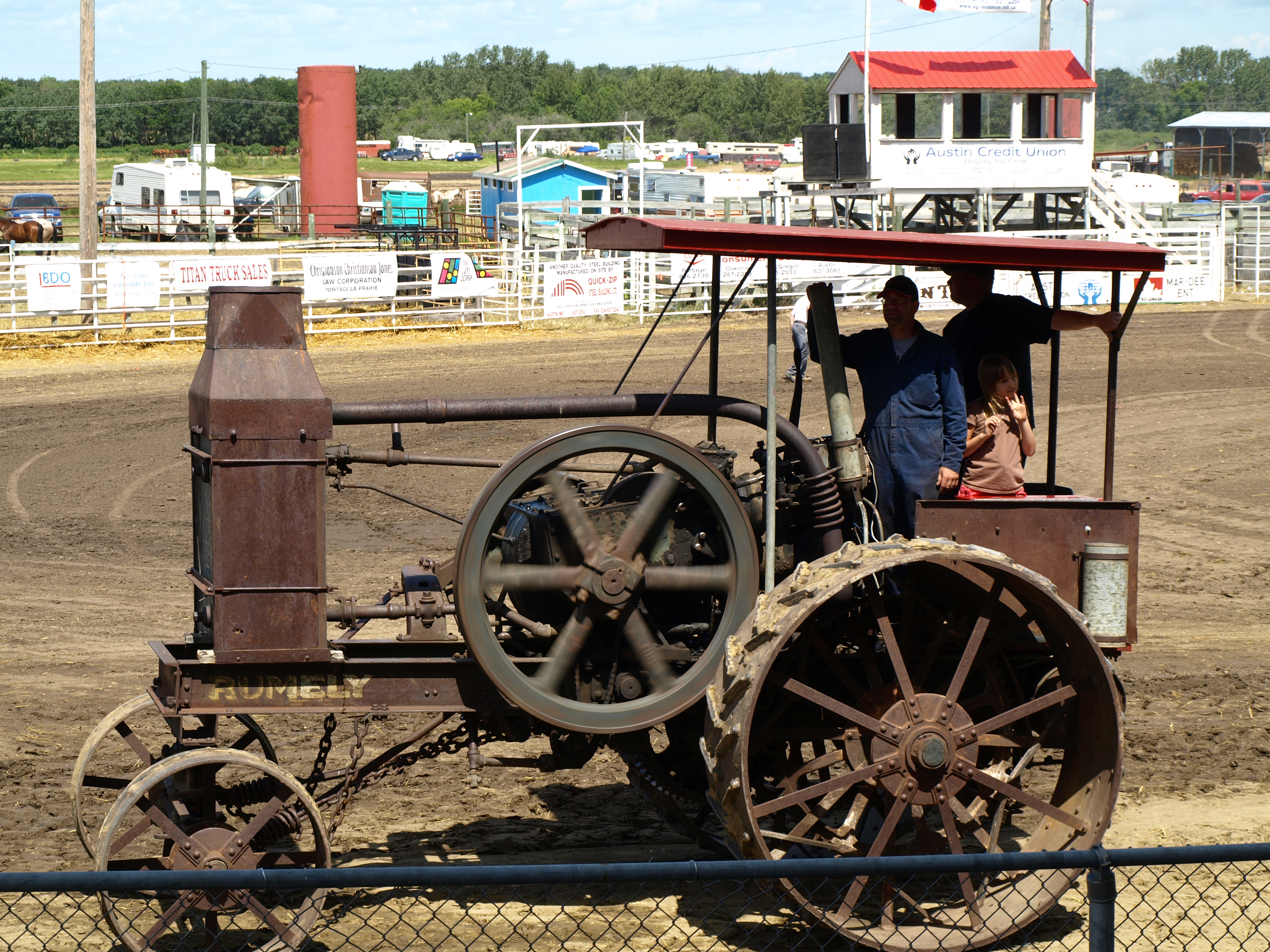
Thresherman's Reunion 2009

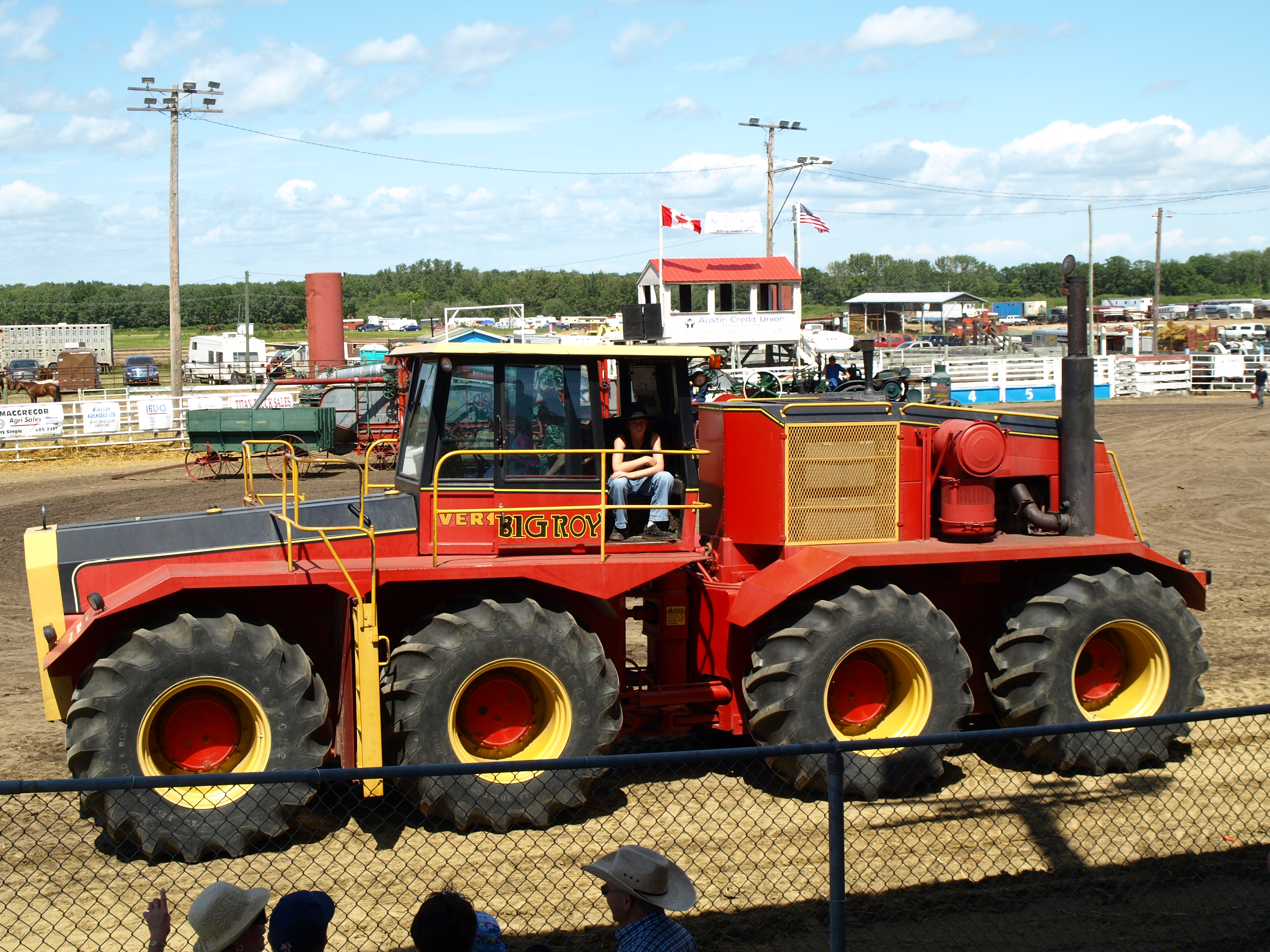
Thresherman's Reunion 2009

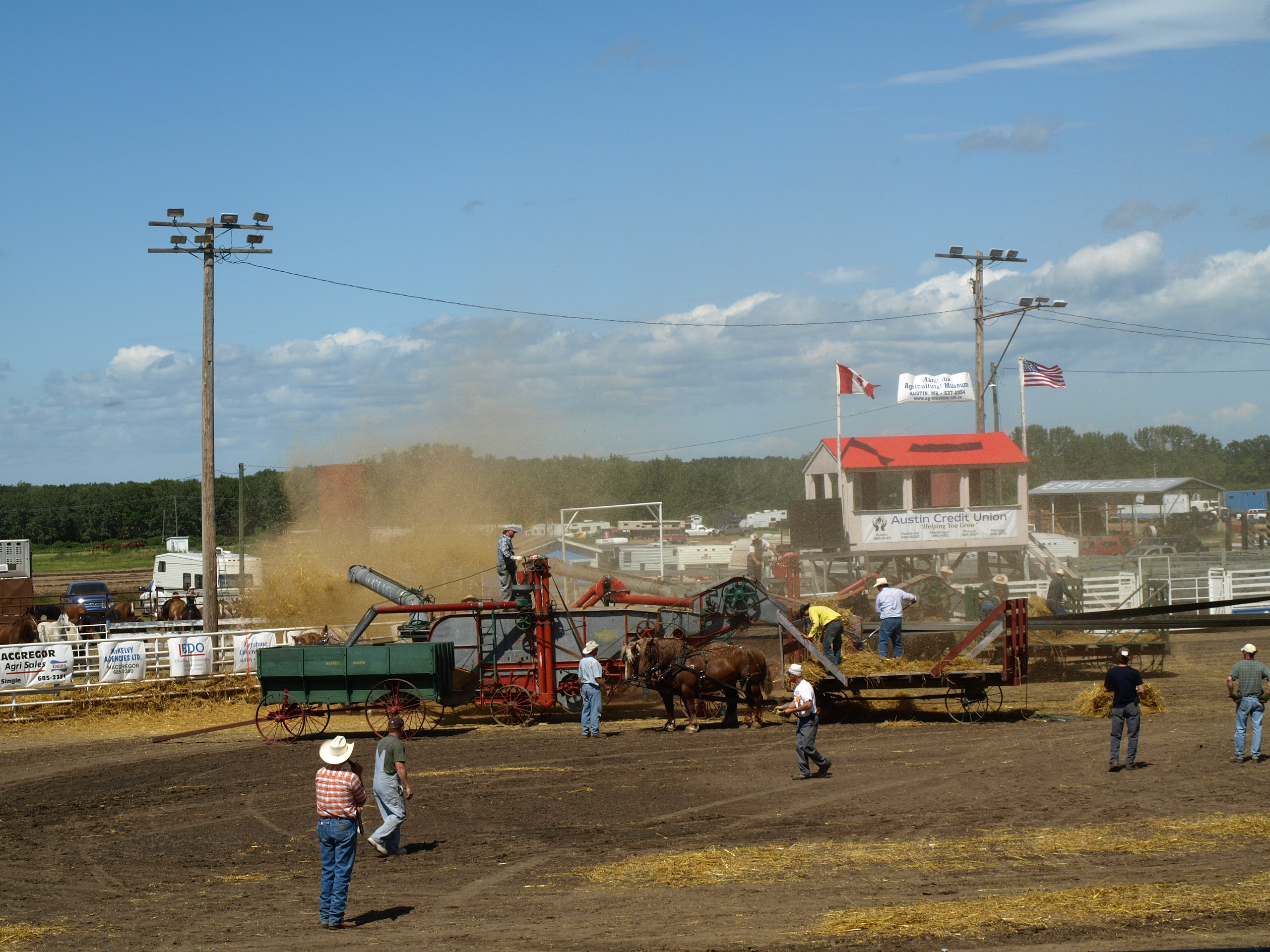
Thresherman's Reunion 2009

== See also ==
- Agriculture in Canada
- Canada Agriculture and Food Museum
- Central Experimental Farm
- Ontario Agricultural Museum
- Ross Farm Museum

== Affiliations ==
The Museum is affiliated with: CMA, CHIN, and Virtual Museum of Canada.
