= Country Heritage Park =

Coordinates: 43°31′00″N 79°56′15″W

- Location: Milton, Ontario, Canada
- Type: Events Venue, Agricultural museum & More!
- Website: Web site

The Country Heritage Park (Formerly the Ontario Agricultural Museum) is located next to Highway 401 and the Niagara Escarpment in Milton, Ontario, Canada, and recreates rural life in the 19th century in Ontario. During the day it also acts as a private school and office, and hosts parties at night.

== History ==
The project was an initiative of the Ontario Ministry of Agriculture and Food, and was established through the passage of the Agricultural Museum Act of 1967, which occurred after private collector Charles Matthews' large collection of agricultural artifacts was acquired.

The initial museum site was situated on a 92-acre parcel of land, next to Kelso Conservation Area on what was then known as West Town Line but was renamed to Tremaine Road in 1967. The farmland for the project was sold in 1966 to Halton County, and later acquired by the Province of Ontario.

The purpose of the museum was to showcase and tell the story of the evolution of Ontario agriculture from its genesis to present day.

The original museum was constructed in three-phases. The first stage consisted of site work including the installation of gravel roads and parking lots. This stage one work was completed in the summer of 1973 by students of the Heavy Equipment School near Milton. The school was affiliated with Sheridan College of Applied Arts and Technology.

A call for tenders was announced in March 1974 by Halton East MPP James Snow for stage two of the new agricultural museum. The second phase completed construction of the 20,000 square foot, one-storey museum building designed by Oakville architects Hallford and Wilson. The main exhibit hall was completed in 1975.

In 1976 3,000 visitors attended the site, and in 1977, there were 5,000 guests. Despite little to no advertising and not yet being fully open to the public, and being closed on weekends initially, 10,000 visitors were expected to come to the Museum in the summer of 1978. By 1979-80, that number was expected to swell to 30,000 per year.

By 1977, the Museum houses a library and archives that held over 2000 volumes of books and resources.

When staff first moved to the site there was only one building, but by mid-1978 an additional 21 buildings had been constructed, and 35 summer students were hired through Experience '78 for research, restoration and construction of museum displays. Between 12,000 and 15,000 items were in the museum's collection in 1978 with 97% being donated.

Stage three of the development envisioned the installation of pioneer farmsteads which would be restored on site, with various regions, time periods and types of Ontario agriculture represented.

In 1977, the Museum had a permanent staff of seven, including the general manager Bob Carbert, but Carbert said in a speech to the Milton Historical Society that year that he anticipated that staffing level was only one-third of the staff he required in order to continue acquiring and restoring artifacts, as well as serving the museum's public visitors.

Although officials initially intended to have a grand opening of the museum to the public in the summer of 1978, staffing shortages (eight full-time staff, plus summer students) somewhat contributed to that target launch being put off until 1979, after only 90% of the indoor exhibit hall was complete by June 1978.

On June 8, 1979, the Museum's grand opening was signaled with the blast of a Sawyer-Massey steam engine's whistle. On hand were 1000 guests to see the $1-million project's opening, including dignitaries such as Milton Mayor Don Gordon, then-Minister of Agriculture Bill Newman (Durham-York), former Agriculture Minister Dr. Bill Stewart, Minister of Transportation James Snow, MPP George Kerr (Burlington-South), Ken Lantz (MPP and Deputy Minister of Agriculture), and Julian Reed (MPP Halton-Burlington).

=== Government Stops Operating Site ===
On April 1, 1997, the Ontario Government ceased its operation of the site, and it was announced in November 1997 that the museum would essentially close, with the anticipation that no public program would be offered in 1998. Initially staff was slashed from 23 to 10 full-time workers. In March 1997, the provincial government cut its funding to the Ontario Agricultural Museum, signaling a shift to private ownership, and a name change to "Farm Museum". Eight months later, in November 1997, 15 historical interpreters and eight staff members were laid off after only 40,000 visitors out of an anticipated 70,000 came to the now-private site that year.

Despite this operational change, the Ontario government provided a subsidy of $325,000 in 1997.

Ultimately control was turned over to a non-profit association called Country Heritage Experience Inc. The board's initial concern was to "stop and get control of the operation" with an eye to self-sufficiency and financial sustainability through the hosting of events, admission revenue, school visits, group tours and facility rentals. Revenues tripled from 1998 to 2001, signaling a dramatic turnaround of fortunes for the 80-acre operation which by 2001 had four full-time staff, 10 part-time historical interpreters, 20,000 artifacts, 30 exhibit buildings, and a large group of volunteers through collector clubs and rural associations that donated 597 volunteer days worth of service in 2000.

=== Renaming to Country Heritage Park ===
On March 24, 2000, Country Heritage Experience Incorporated, which runs the park, unveiled a new name, "Country Heritage Park, A Farm and Country Experience". The name change was made in an effort to attract a new, younger and more urban audience to the farm museum.

== See also ==
- Agriculture in Canada
- Canada Agriculture and Food Museum
- Central Experimental Farm
- Manitoba Agricultural Museum
- Ross Farm Museum
