= Austin, Manitoba =

Coordinates: 49°57′01″N 98°56′10″W

Austin is an unincorporated community recognized as a local urban district in western Manitoba on the Trans-Canada Highway about 110 km (68 mi) west of Winnipeg. It is part of the Municipality of North Norfolk. It sits at the western edge of the table-flat Portage Plains, but to the south and west is surrounded by miles of low wooded hills known as the Carberry sandhills. The biggest attraction is the annual rodeo and Threshermen's Reunion held at the Manitoba Agricultural Museum the last four business days of July.

Austin received its name in 1881 from the Marquis of Lorne, then Governor General of Canada while he was on a western tour during construction of the Canadian Pacific Railway. Many Plautdietsch-speaking immigrants of Mennonite denomination moved into the Austin, Manitoba area.

Austin has an elementary school, a postal office, a curling/hockey rink, two grocery stores and a credit union.

One of the main highlights for the community is the Austin Amateur Hockey League. This is a hockey league that was founded in 2011 with 8 teams. There are currently 12 teams playing in the Austin Amateur Hockey League. Teams in the AAHL play through the season to win the Corner Cup. Teams that have won the Corner Cup include the Flames, (2012, 2014), the Oilers, (2013), and the Royals, (2015).

== Demographics ==
In the 2021 Census of Population conducted by Statistics Canada, Austin had a population of 415 living in 189 of its 214 total private dwellings, a change of -1.7% from its 2016 population of 422. With a land area of 1.9 km^{2} (0.73 sq mi), it had a population density of 218.4/km^{2} (565.7/sq mi) in 2021.

== Gallery ==
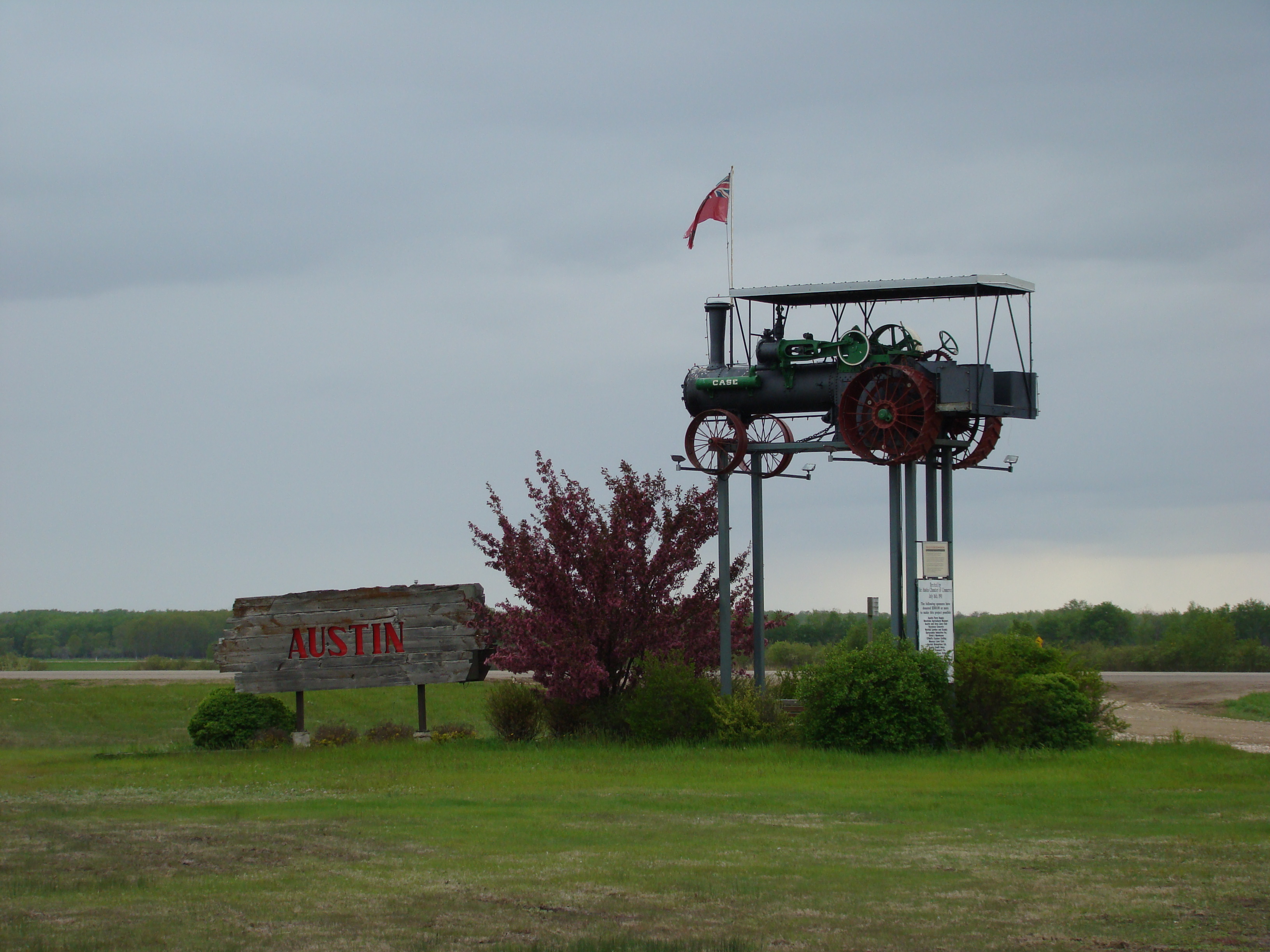

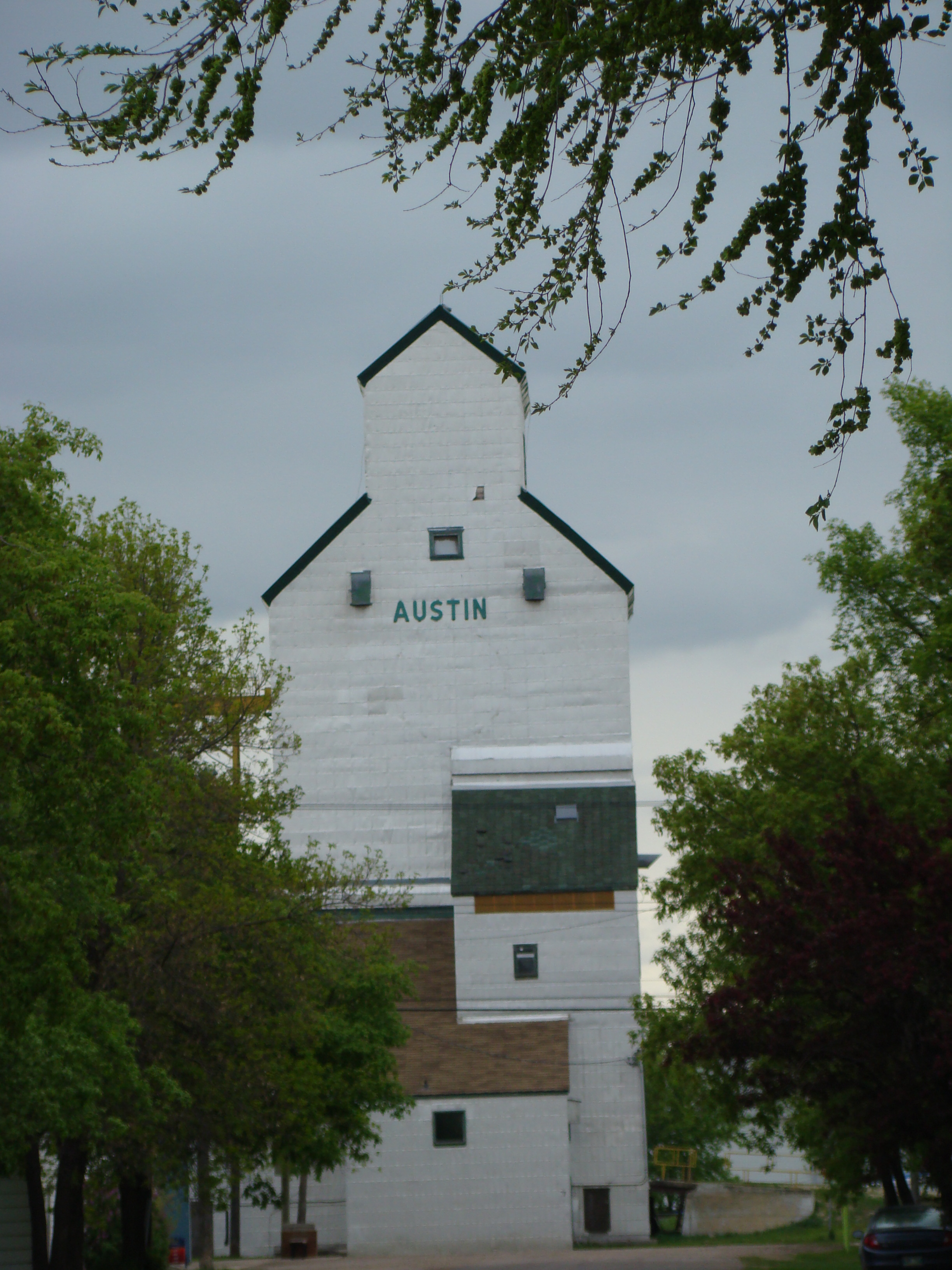

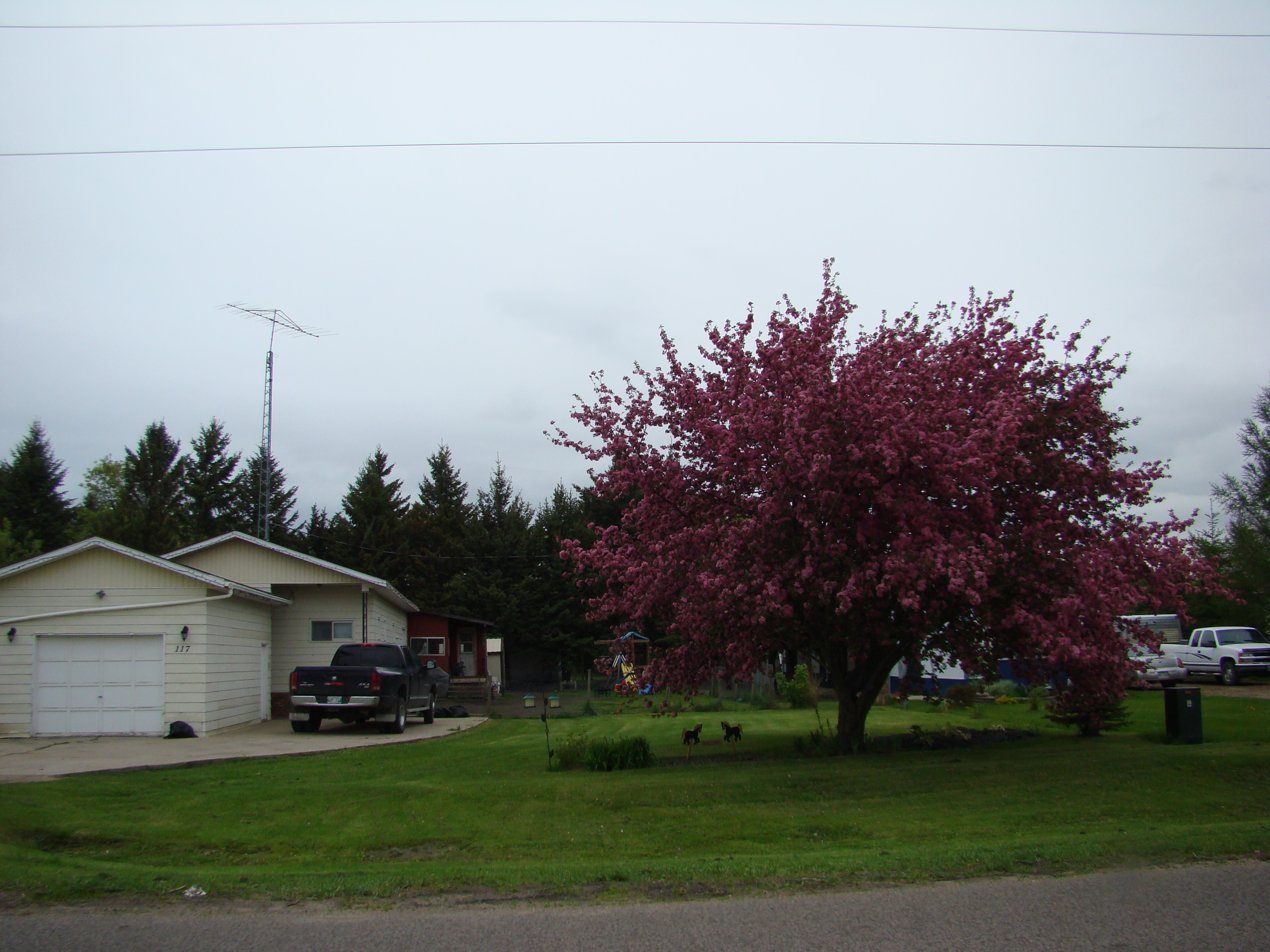

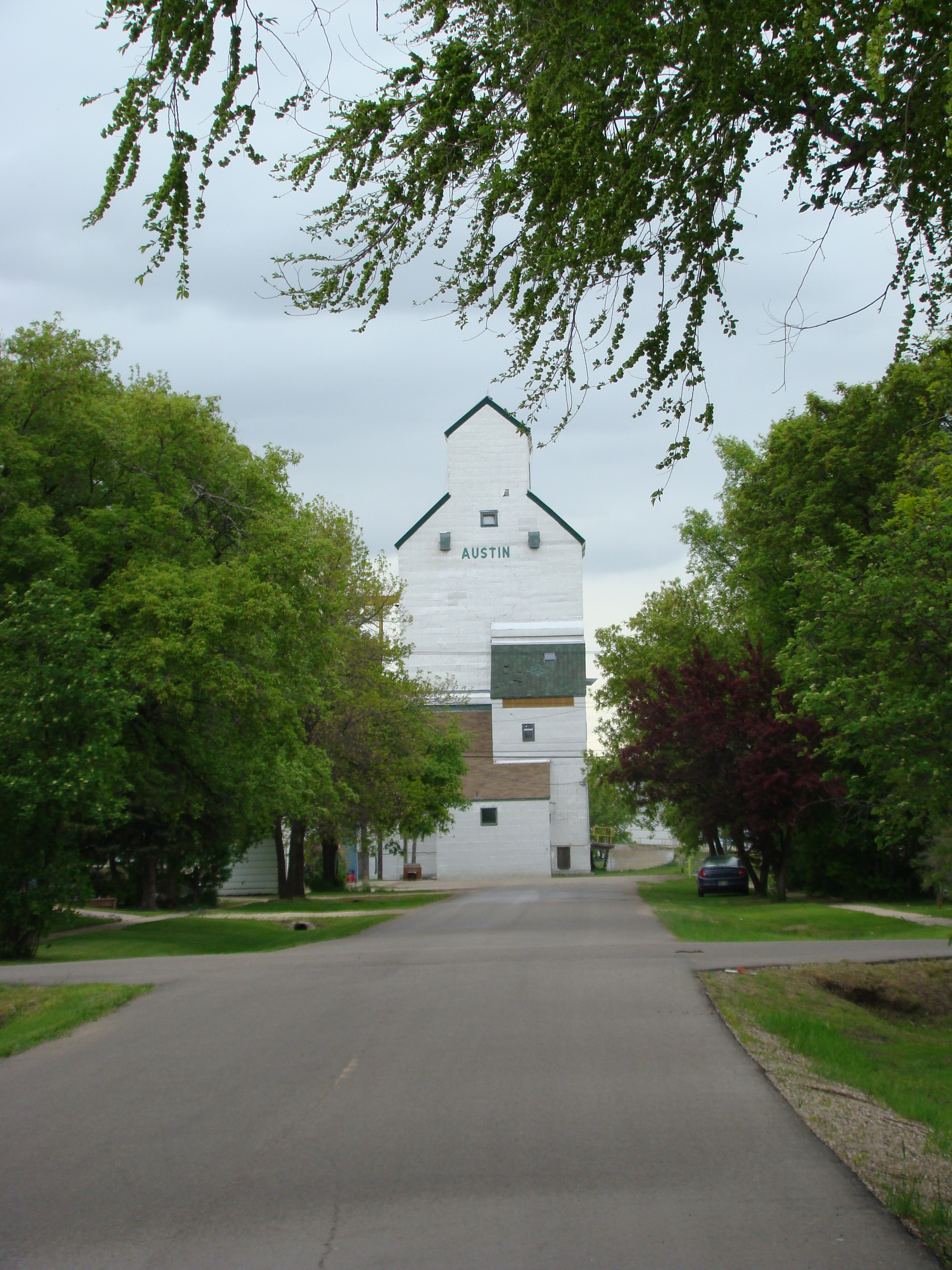

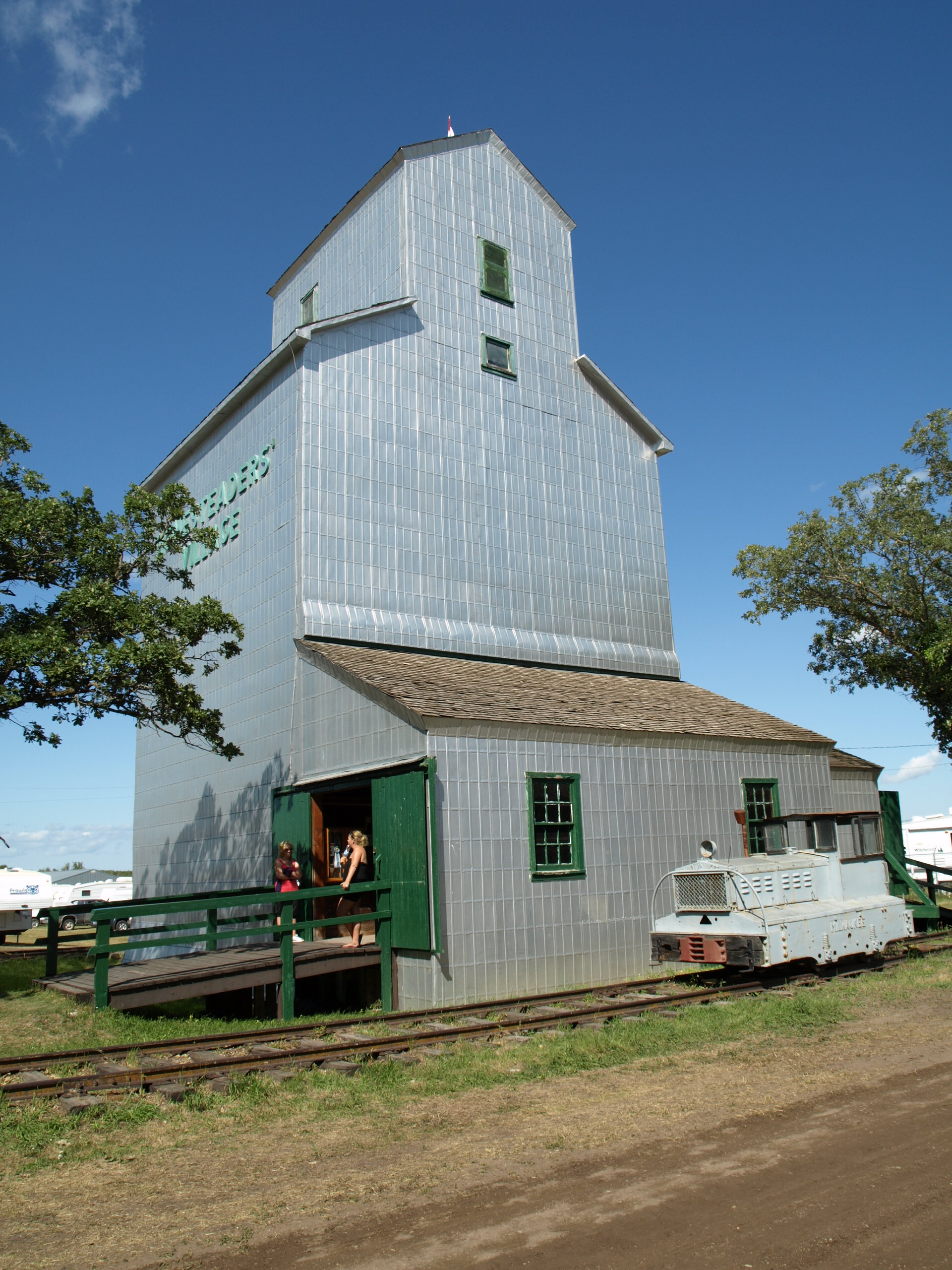
Manitoba Agriculture Museum

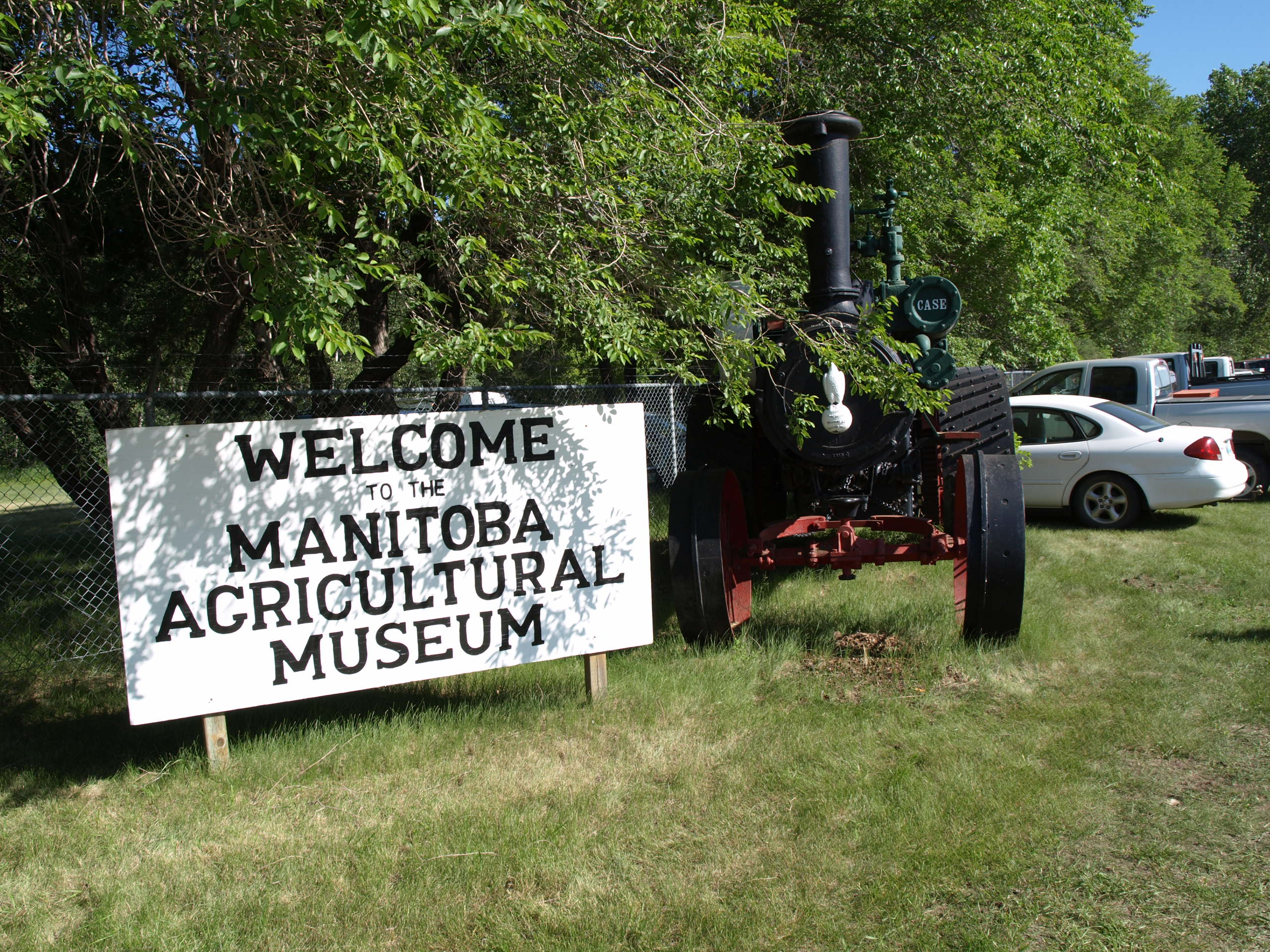
Manitoba Agriculture Museum

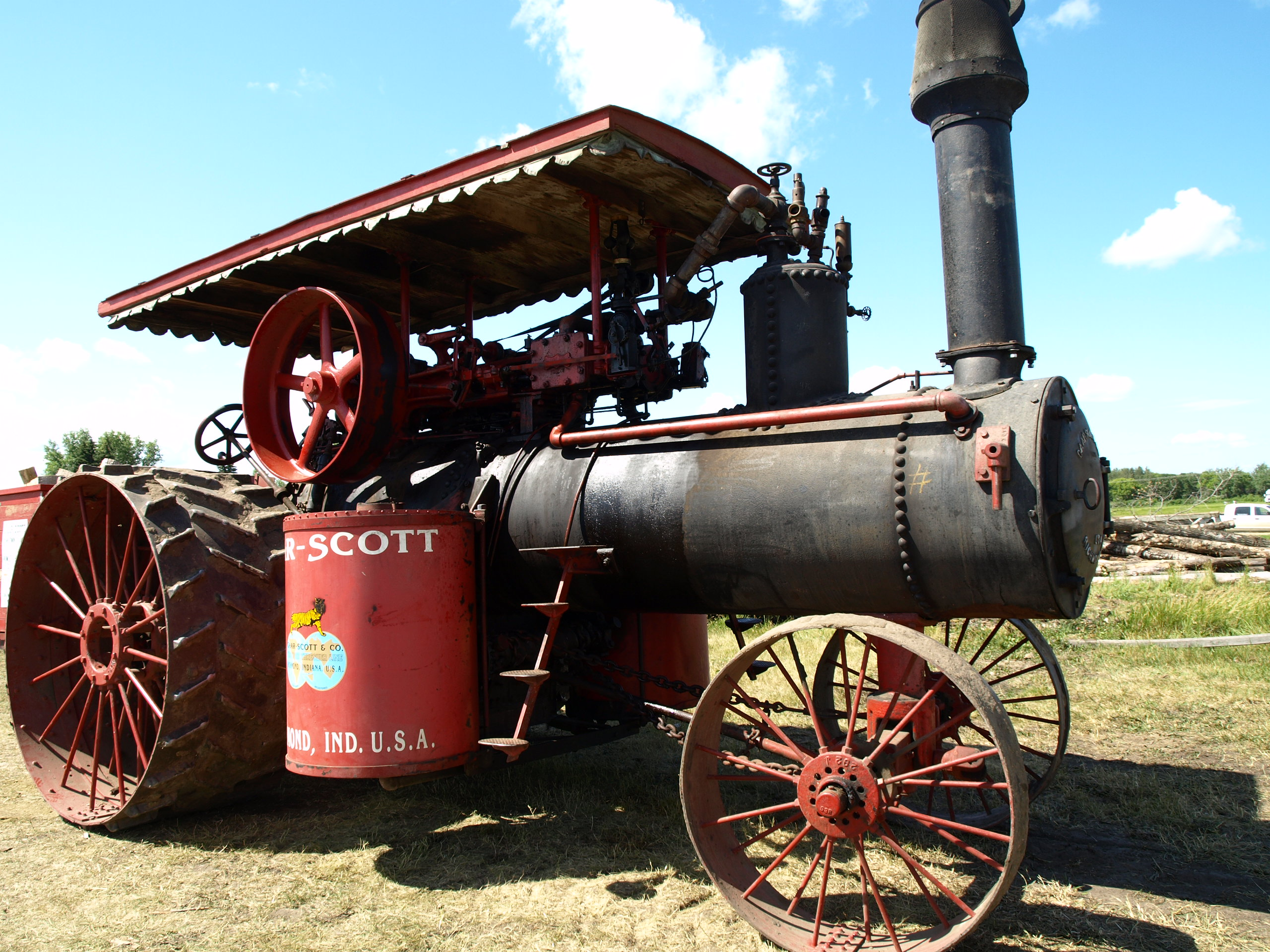
Manitoba Agriculture Museum

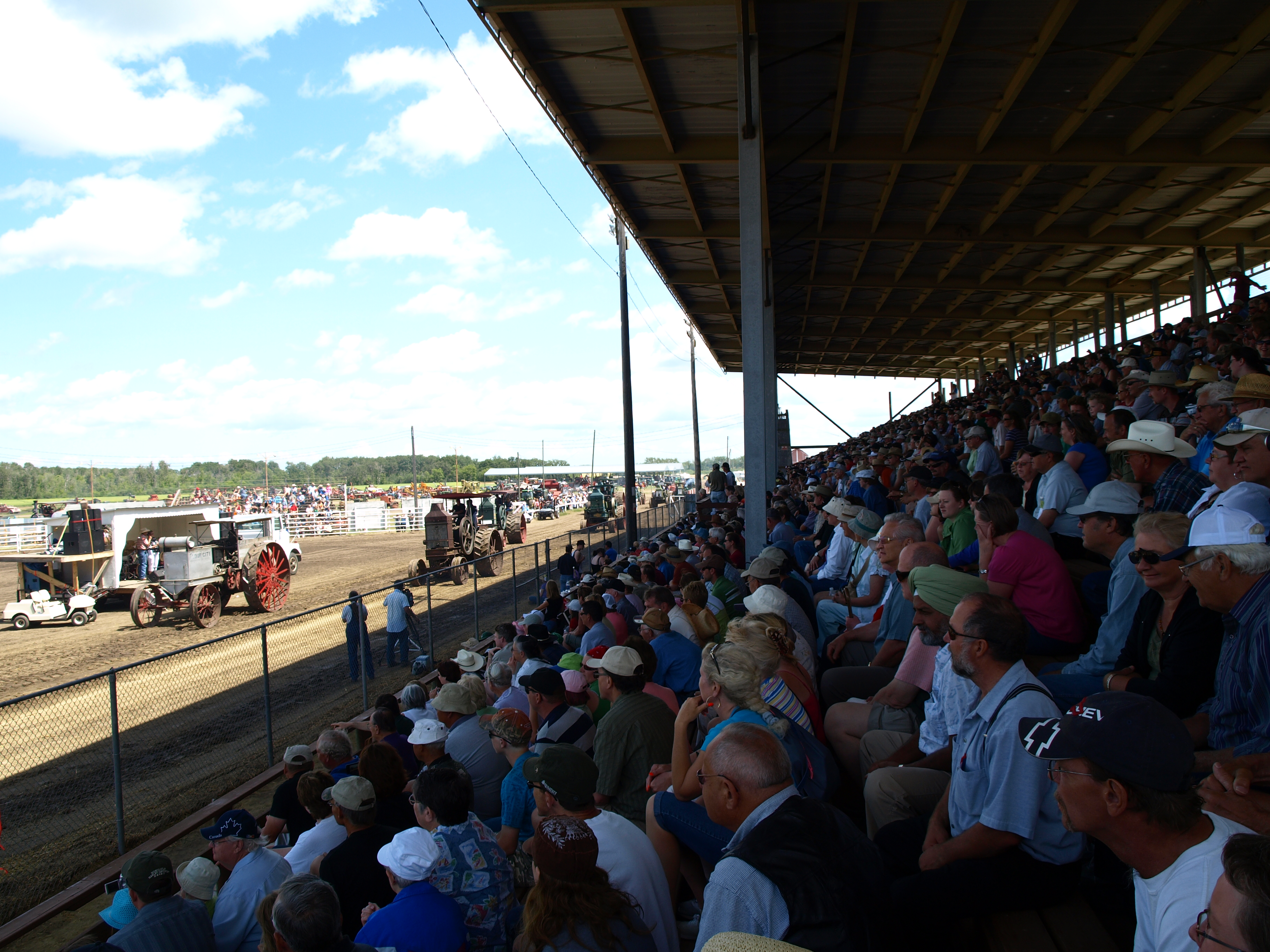
Thresherman's Reunion at Manitoba Agriculture Museum
