= Agriculture in Canada =

Canada is one of the largest agricultural producers and exporters in the world. As with other developed nations, the proportion of the population agriculture employed and agricultural GDP as a percentage of the national GDP fell dramatically over the 20th century, but it remains an important element of the Canadian economy. A wide range of agriculture is practiced in Canada from Newfoundland on the Atlantic to British Columbia on the Pacific. In the federal government, overview of Canadian agriculture is the responsibility of the Department of Agriculture and Agri-Food.

== Major agricultural products ==
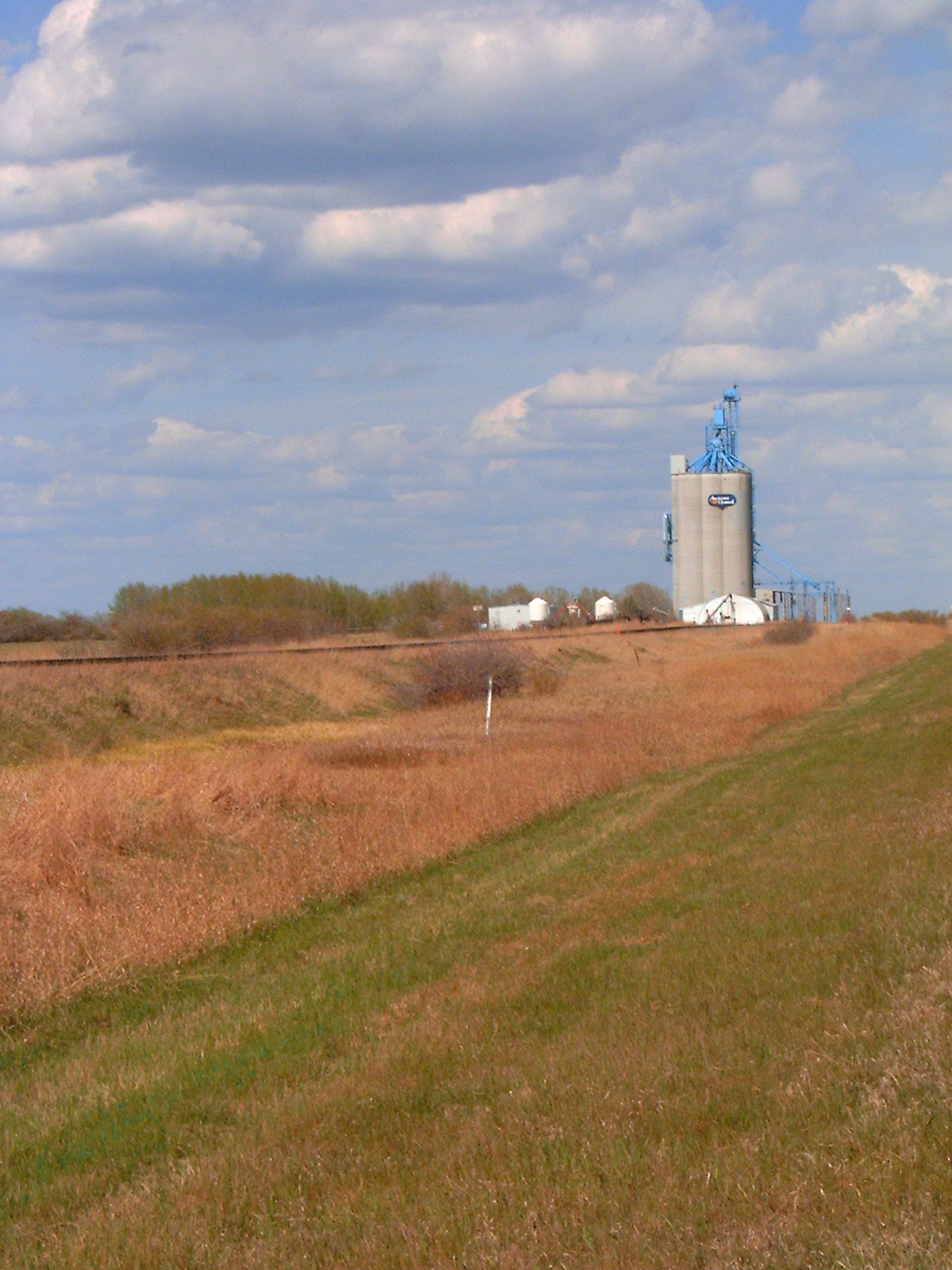
Concrete grain elevator in Alberta

Various factors affect the socio-economic characteristics of Canadian agriculture. The 2006 Census of Agriculture listed seven: Quantity and type of farms; Biogeography: crop and land use areas; land management practices; Quantity of livestock and poultry; Agricultural engineering: Farm machinery and equipment; Farm capital; Farm operating expenses and receipts; Farm-related injuries.

Early in the 21st century, Canadian agronomists were aware of 58 "primary grain, vegetable and fruit crops", based on surface area and value. In 2007, the Canadian Federation of Agriculture broke down into five primary "production sectors" Canadian agriculture according to cash receipts:

1. grains and oilseeds: 34% (includes wheat, durum, oats, barley, rye, flax seed, canola, soybeans, rice, and corn)
2. red meats: 24% (includes beef cattle, hogs, veal, and lamb)
3. dairy: 12%
4. horticulture: 9%
5. poultry and eggs: 8%

In 2018, Canada was the world's largest producer of rapeseed (20.3 million tonnes), dry pea (3.5 million tonnes) and lentil (2 million tons), the 2nd largest producer of oats in the world (3.4 million tons), the 6th largest world producer of wheat (31.7 million tons) and barley (8.3 million tons), the 7th largest world producer of soy (7.2 million tons), the 10th largest world producer of maize (13.8 million tons) and the 12th largest world producer of potato (5.7 million tonnes). In the same year, the country also produced 688 thousand tons of flax, 505 thousand tons of sugar beet (which is used to produce sugar), 497 thousand tons of tomato, 424 thousand tons of apple, 354 thousand tons of carrots, 341 thousand tons of beans, 311 thousand tons of chickpeas, 236 thousand tons of rye, 240 thousand tons of onion, 219 thousand tons of cabbage, 195 thousand tons of cranberry, 164 thousand tons of blueberry, 173 thousand tons of mustard seed, 138 thousand tons of mushroom and truffle, 120 thousand tons of grape, in addition to smaller productions of other agricultural products.

=== Grains and oilseeds ===
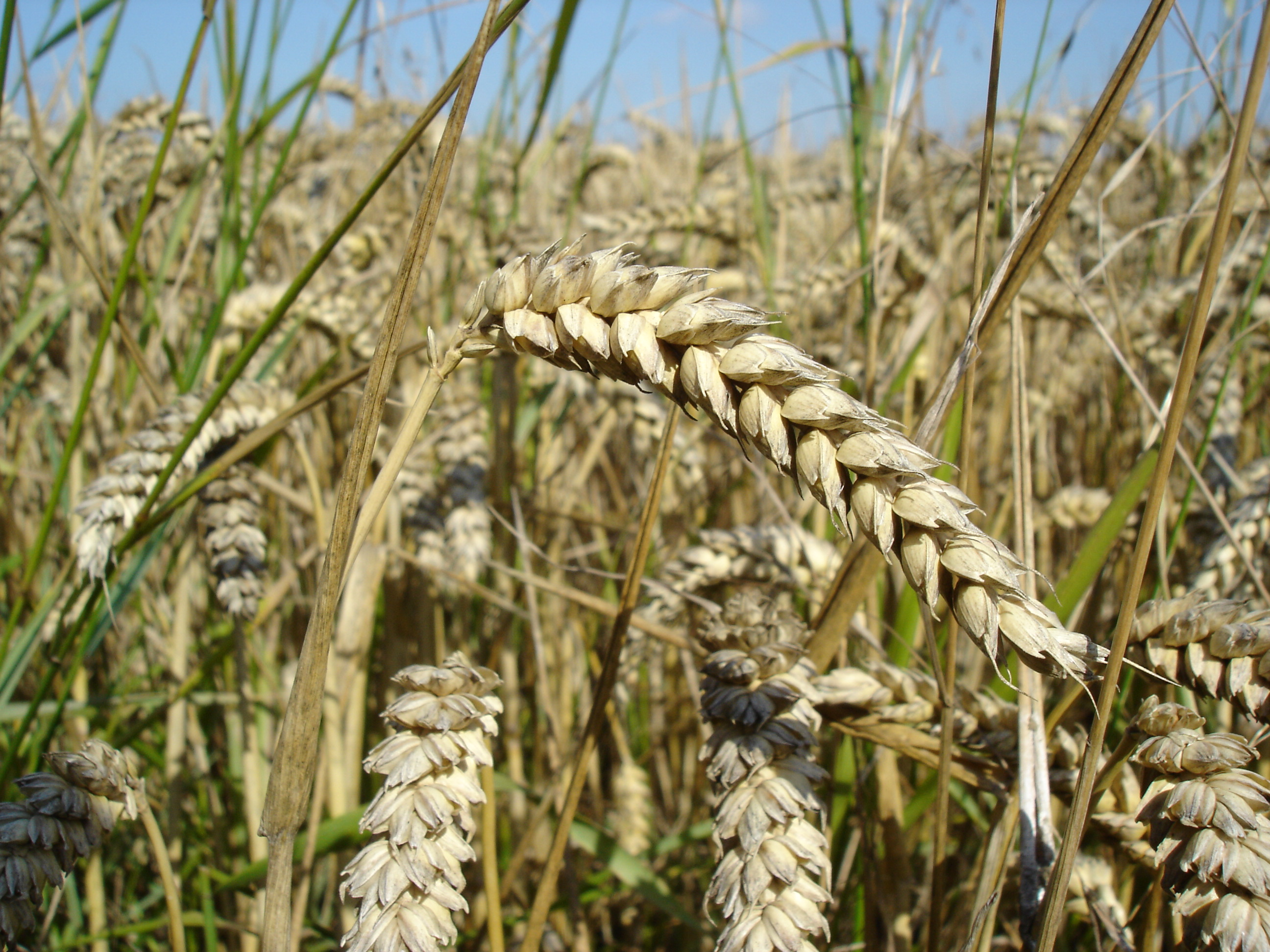
Wheat head close up view

In 1925, Saskatchewan produced over half of the wheat in the Dominion of Canada, threshing more than 240,000,000 bushels (6,500,000 metric tons) of wheat. Rapeseed, alfalfa, barley, canola, flax, rye, and oats are other popularly grown grain crops.

Wheat is a staple crop from Canada. To help homesteaders attain an abundance harvest in a foreshortened growing season, varieties of wheat were developed at the beginning of the 20th century. Red Fife was the first strain; it was a wheat which could be seeded in the fall and sprout in the early spring. Red Fife ripened nearly two weeks sooner and was a harder wheat than other spring wheats. Dr. C. Saunders, experimented further with Red Fife, and developed Marquis Wheat, which was resistant to rust and came to maturity within 100 days. Some other types of wheat grown are durum, spelt, and winter wheat. In recent years, Canadian farmers have also begun to grow rice.

The Prairie Farm Rehabilitation Administration (PFRA) was established in 1935 to provide Federal financial assistance in regard to the global economical crisis. The PFRA provides farmers with land and water resources such as irrigation, soil drifting conservation and small farm water development. The Farm credit program has established the Canadian Farm Loan Act to provide stock bonds and farm improvement loans.

=== Livestock ===
115,000 cattle roamed the southern prairies by 1900. Livestock can include the raising of cows, also commonly called cattle. Recently domestication of the buffalo and elk has initiated a new food industry. Sheep have been raised for both wool and meat. Bovine or pig barns have been a part of livestock culture. Scientists have been making forward steps in swine research giving rise to intensive pig farming. The domestication of various farm animals meant that corresponding industries such as feedlots, animal husbandry and meat processing have also been studied, and developed. Two corporations (Cargill Foods and Brazil-based multinational JBS) control 80 percent of beef processing, and four retailers capture 72 percent of retail sales.

Total Canadian Farm Animals Slaughtered in 2023
Type	2023
Cattle	3,378,100
Calves	205,900
Pigs	21,925,600
Sheep and lambs	778,200
Chickens	803,086,000
Turkeys	20,515,000

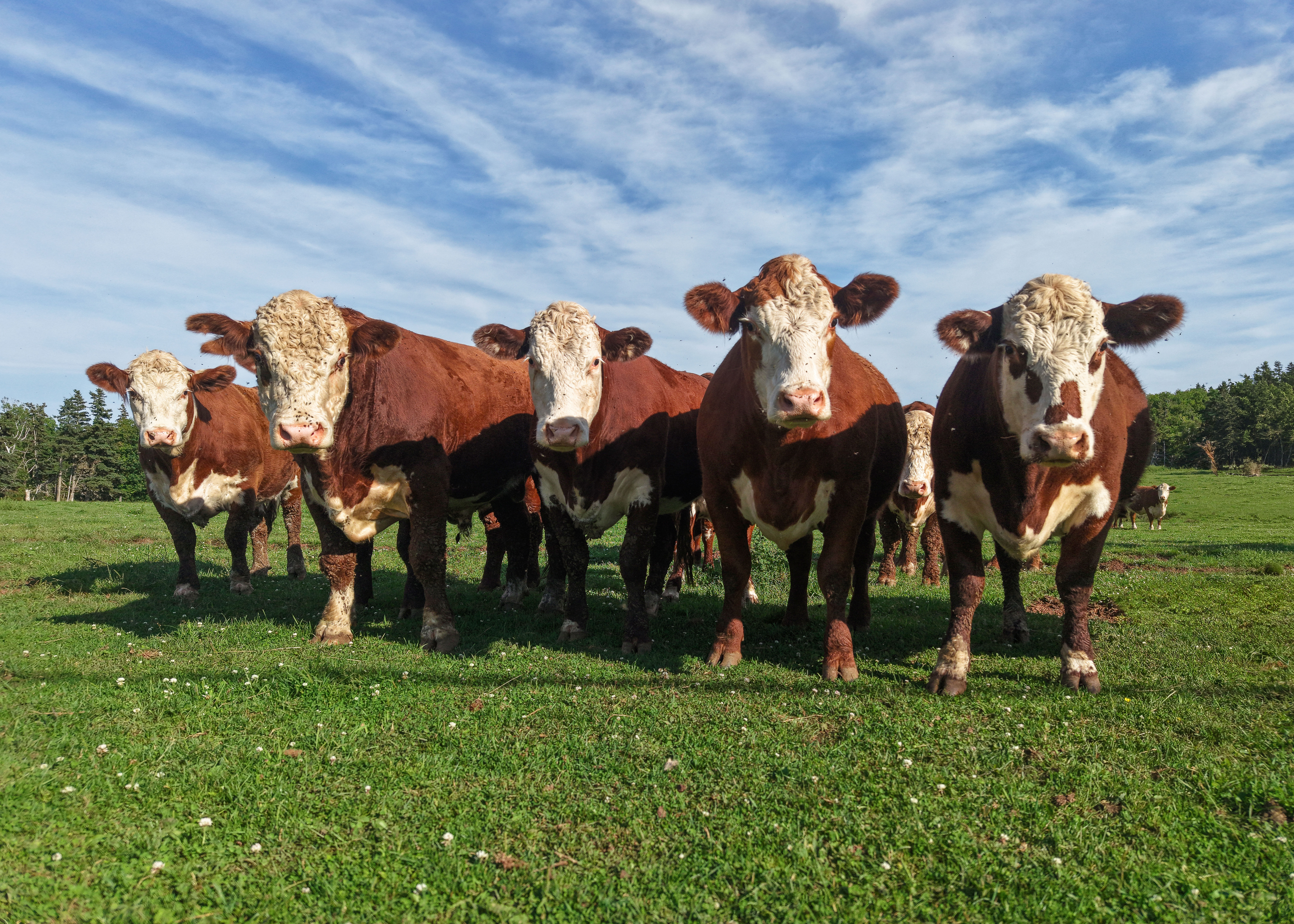
A herd of Hereford cattle in Prince Edward Island

From 1921 to 2011, farming operations have become more intensive and specialized. The total number of animal farms in Canada went from 8.1 per 100 inhabitants to 0.6 per 100 inhabitants. During this period, the number of Canadian pigs rose from 3,324,291 to 12,679,104, while the number of pig farms dropped from 452,935 to 7,371. In 2011, the hog industry was the fourth largest in Canada, after canola, dairy products and cattle, with cash receipts of $3.9 billion. The size of farms had also increased substantially, with the national average rising to 1,720 hogs per operation in 2011.

Canadian Livestock, 1951 to 2016 (from Statistics Canada)
Type	Unit of Measure	1951	2016
Cattle and calves	Number of cattle farms	452,480	75,307
Cattle and calves	Number of animals	8,370,991	12,530,730
Cattle and calves	Average number of animals per farm	17	166
Pigs	Number of pig farms	364,068	8,402
Pigs	Number of animals	4,915,987	14,091,503
Pigs	Average number of animals per farm	14	1,677
Horses	Number of horse farms	451,647	39,164
Horses	Number of animals	1,306,634	291,561
Horses	Average number of animals per farm	3	7
Sheep and lambs	Number of sheep farms	62,566	9,390
Sheep and lambs	Number of animals	1,478,737	1,054,260
Sheep and lambs	Average number of animals per farm	24	112
Chickens	Number of chicken farms	427,317	23,910
Chickens	Number of animals	64,615,025	145,519,566
Chickens	Average number of animals per farm	151	6,086

=== Dairy farming ===
Like poultry, dairy farming in Canada is restricted under the system of supply management. In 2016 there were approximately 17,840 dairy cattle and milk production farm operators in Canada.

=== Horticulture ===
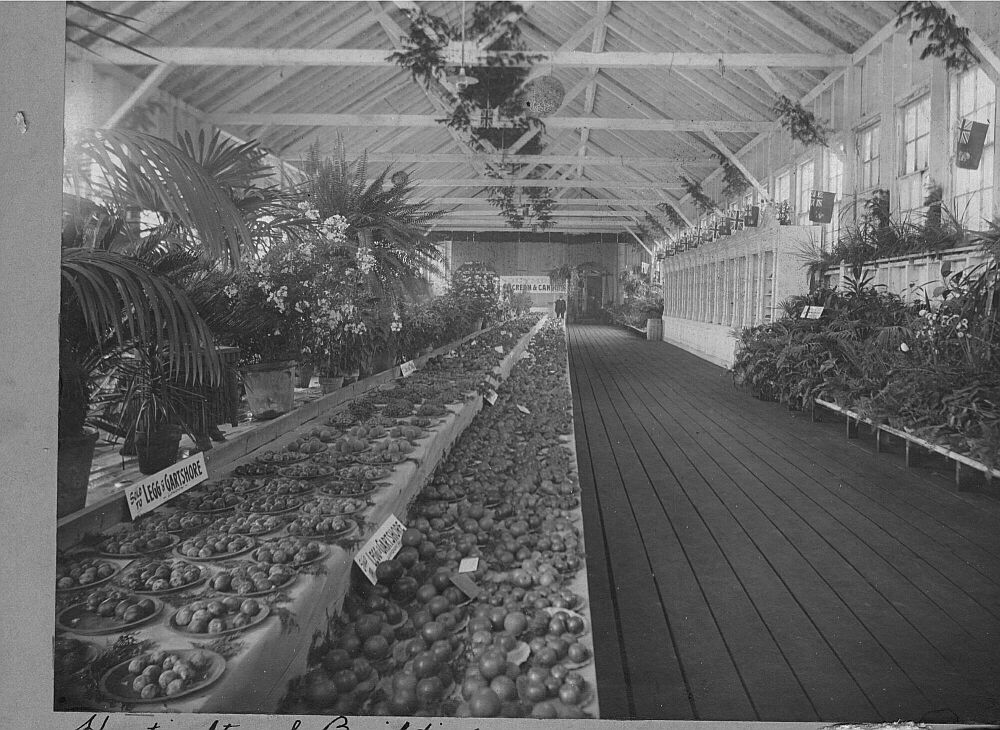
Vegetable displays

Horticulture crops, which includes nursery, flowers and fruits, became easier to grow with the development of plant hardiness zones. Apples, pears, plums and prunes, peaches, apricots, cherries, strawberries, raspberries, loganberries and fruit orchards are numerous and reach commercial size in the Annapolis Valley of Nova Scotia, New Brunswick, Quebec, Niagara Peninsula and Norfolk County of Ontario and Okanagan Valley of British Columbia.

Hazelnuts are harvested in Eastern Canada and British Columbia. Maple syrup and maple sugar, maple butter, and maple taffy are products of Quebec along the St. Lawrence River. The main market for Canadian maple syrup and sugar is the United States. Potatoes are an abundant harvest of the Maritime provinces. Sugar beets and beet root sugar are harvested in Quebec, Ontario, Manitoba, and Alberta.

==== Viticulture ====
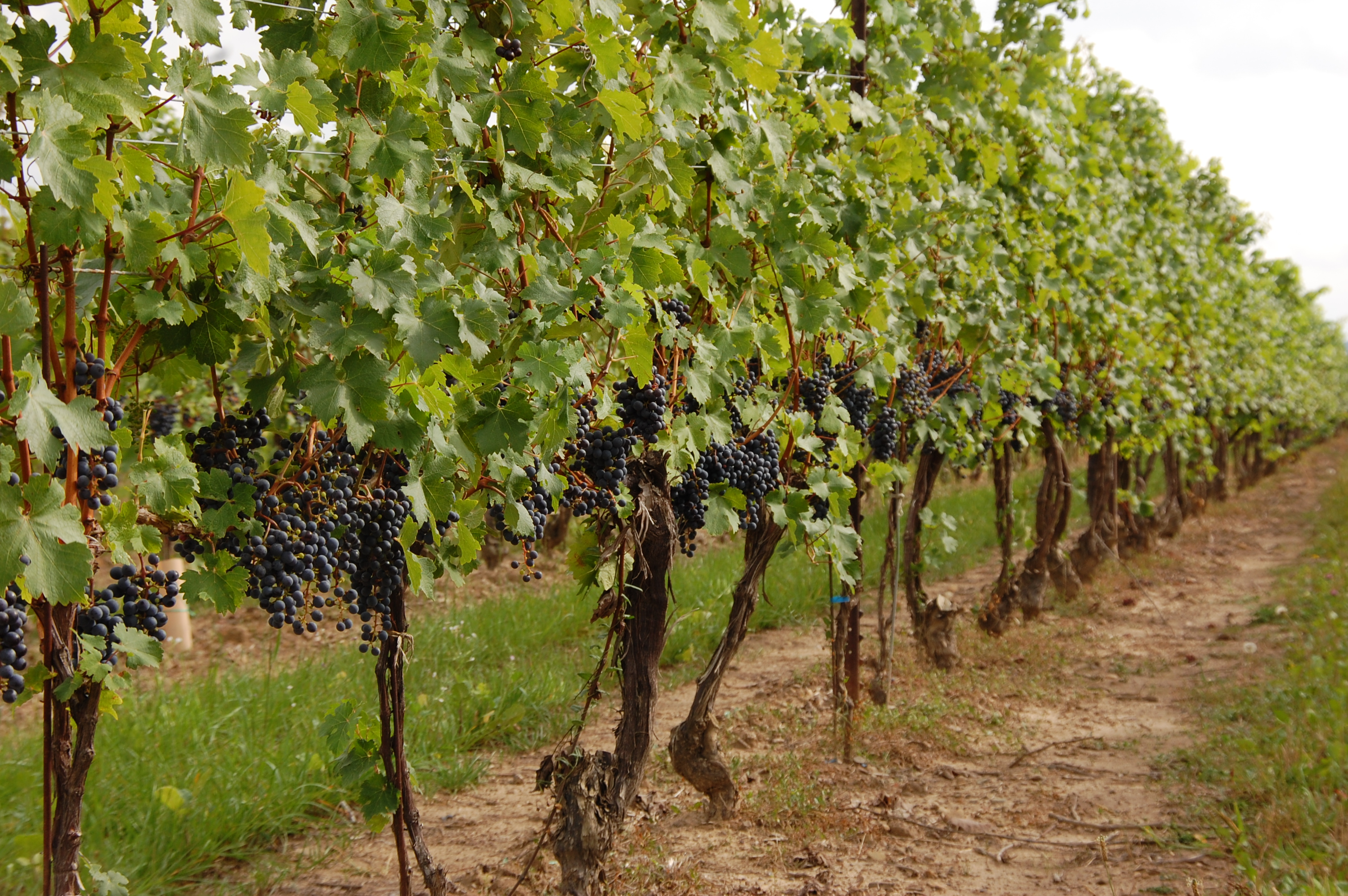
Grapevines at Inniskillin, a winery in the Niagara region of Ontario

Viticulture refers to the growing of grapes for the production of wine. Ontario, and British Columbia are the two largest wine-growing regions in Canada, although grapes are also grown in other regions of Canada, including Quebec, and the Maritimes. In 2015, Canada produced 56.2 million litres of wine. Approximately 62 per cent of all wines produced that year originated from Ontario, while wineries from British Columbia constituted 33 per cent of that years wine production. Canada is the largest producer of ice wine, producing more ice wine than all other countries combined.

In 2015, there were 548 wineries spread across 12,150 hectares (30,000 acres). More than half of Canada's vineyard acreage is situated in Ontario, with 150 vineyards spread across 6,900 hectares (17,000 acres). British Columbia holds 240 wineries, spread throughout 4,152 hectares (10,260 acres). There are 138 wineries in Quebec, which manage 808 hectares (2,000 acres) of vineyards in the province. Nova Scotia holds 20 wineries, which manages 290 hectares (720 acres) of vineyards in the province.

=== Poultry and eggs ===
Fowl, poultry, eggs, chickens, geese, ducks and turkeys are part of a system of supply management. Under supply management, production is limited, prices are raised, and competition is severely curtailed, raising profits for farmers through artificially high prices for poultry and eggs paid by consumers. There are around 3,000 poultry farmers and 1,000 egg farmers in Canada.

Canadian Egg Production, 1920 to 2024 (from Statistics Canada)
Unit of Measure	1920	2024
Number of laying chickens	14,229,000	37,074,000
Total eggs laid	112,148,000	915,020,000
Eggs laid per chicken	96	296

Canadian Poultry, 1976 to 2016 (from Statistics Canada)
Type	Unit of Measure	1976	2021
Chickens	Number of chicken farms	99,128	23,547
Chickens	Number of animals	87,071,513	152,299,258
Chickens	Average number of animals per farm	878	6,468
Turkeys	Number of turkey farms	13,810	2,225
Turkeys	Number of animals	8,828,549	6,084,098
Turkeys	Average number of animals per farm	639	2,734

=== Aquaculture ===
145,985 tonnes of aquatic life were killed in Canadian aquaculture systems in 2023. The total aquaculture production that year was worth $1,259,693,000.

=== Fur ===
Mink and foxes are farmed in Canada for their fur. The total value of mink pelts produced in 2018 was 44 million dollars. This value included pelts taken from animals that died and spring peltings.

Canadian Fur Farming, 1981 to 2006 (from Statistics Canada)
Type	Unit of Measure	1981	2006
Mink	Number of mink farms	561	221
Mink	Number of animals	1,765,184	1,903,918
Mink	Average number of animals per farm	3,146	8,615
Foxes	Number of fox farms	341	106
Foxes	Number of animals	29,980	12,409
Foxes	Average number of animals per farm	88	117

=== Sod ===
In 2025, there were 247 sod operations in Canada, an increase of one from 2024, cultivating 20,595 hectares of land, which represents a 0.13% annual increase. In the same year, sales rose by 2.06% to $164.8 million. Sales are closely tied to housing market demand, which drives demand for sod.

William Ruthven, a farmer from Alliston, Ontario, is credited as a pioneer of commercial sod farming in North America. In 1952, he founded the Ruthven Merion Sod Company, cultivating 900 acres of turf grass to meet the booming post-war housing demand. Ruthven shipped sod hundreds of miles, including to Chicago, Illinois, and Washington, D.C., taking advantage of markets where the highly demanded Merion Bluegrass wasn’t available.

Brouwer Kesmac is a sod harvester and turf equipment manufacturer based in Keswick, Ontario. Founded by Gerry Brouwer in 1972, the company introduced a tractor-mounted sod harvester that cut the sod, transferred it onto a conveyor, rolled it, and placed the rolls onto a pallet, reducing the labour required on the average operation by 6 to 8 workers. Brouwer Kesmac's equipment is sold worldwide and is recognized as the most widely used in the industry.

=== Other ===
In recent years farmers have been producing alternative crops which are economically viable, and amongst these are organic farm crops. Hemp and wool from sheep are the main areas of fibre production of Canada. Wool production was on average 16,022,000 pounds (7,267 t) in the 1930s and 9,835,000 pounds (4,461 t) in 1949. Fibre flax from flaxseed has been exported to the United Kingdom. Crop growers may supplement their income with beeswax and honey and learn beekeeping. Enterprising land owners have had success growing as well as packaging and marketing the sunflower seed. Crops are not only for human consumption but also for animal consumption, which opens a new market such as canary seed. Cuniculture, or rabbit farming, is another livestock enterprise. Cannabis is an important crop in some areas, making up 5% of British Columbia's GDP. According to BC Business Magazine, the crop is worth $7.5 billion to the province annually, and gives employment to 250,000 people.

=== Number of farms by Province/Territory ===
Province/Territory	Number of Farms (2021 data)
Alberta	41,505
British Columbia	15,841
Manitoba	14,543
New Brunswick	1,851
Newfoundland and Labrador	400
Nova Scotia	2,741
Ontario	48,346
Prince Edward Island	1,300
Quebec	29,400
Saskatchewan	34,128
Northwest Territories	8
Nunavut	0
Yukon	88

== Canadian agricultural government departments ==
The Constitution Act, 1867 states each province has jurisdiction over agriculture, it also vests concurrent jurisdiction in the federal government. Newfoundland agricultural affairs were dealt with by the Agricultural Division of the Department of Natural Resources at Confederation.

The Constitution also states that the federal Government has sole authority in coastal and inland fishery matters. Provinces have rights over non-tidal waters and fishing practices there only.

Canadian agricultural government departments
Department	Function
Agriculture and Agri-Food Canada	Responsible for policies governing agriculture production, farming income, research and development, inspection, and the regulation of animals and plants. Headed by the Minister of Agriculture (Canada).
Canadian Dairy Commission	Responsible for providing dairy producers a fair return for labour and investment and provide consumers with high quality dairy products.
Canadian Food Inspection Agency	CFIA consolidates the delivery of all federal food, animal and plant health inspection programs.
Canadian Grain Commission	Responsible for the grain industry. Headed by the Minister of Agriculture and Agri-food
Canadian Wheat Board	
Fisheries and Oceans Canada	Responsibility for the conservation and sustainable use of Canada's fisheries resources.
National Farm Products Council	Responsible for promoting efficient and competitive agriculture in Canada and oversees the Canadian Egg Marketing Agency, Canadian Turkey Marketing Agency, Chicken Farmers of Canada and Canada Hatching Egg Producers.

== Agricultural economy ==
Canadian farms, fisheries and ranches produce a wide variety of crops, livestock, food, feed, fibre, fuel and other goods by the systematic raising of plants and animals which are dependent upon the geography of the province. In 2001 farms numbered only 246,923 at a size of 676 acres (2.74 km^{2}) as the production of food and fibre for human or livestock sustenance has evolved into intensive and industrial practices. As of 2002, wheat constituted the largest crop area at 12.6%. Canadian farmers received a record $36.3 billion in 2001 from livestock, crop sales and program payments. In 2001, the accrued net income of farm operators from farm production amounted to 1,633 million dollars, which amounts to 0.147% of Canada's gross domestic product at market prices which is 1,108,200 million dollars. Fisheries are also playing an important role while forestry plays a secondary role. Canada's evolution has abandoned subsistence techniques and now sees a mere 3% of Canada's population employed as a mechanized industrial farmer who are able feed the rest of the nation's population of 30,689.0 thousand people (2001) as well as export to foreign markets. (Canada's estimated population was 32,777,300 on 1 January 2007).

== Trade ==
The marketing and economic movement of Canada's various agriculture commodities has been a challenge. Domestic trade encompasses providing goods within Canada provincially and inter-provincial. Support agencies and services such as storage, railways, warehouses, stores, banking institutions all affect domestic trade. Trade of wheat from the Canada's prairies was monitored by the Canadian Wheat Board (CWB) prior to the privatization and sale of the CWB to foreign interests in 2015. Canada's depression of 1882–1897 brought a low of 64¼ cents per bushel ($24/t) as of 1893. This era during Laurier's administration saw thousands of homesteads cancelled. Wheat prices soared during World War I. In 1928, Canada exported high quantities of wheat, flour, and goods. The depression took its toll on Canada as exports sunk to approximately 40% of their 1928 amount. European markets stopped needing to import Canadian wheat as they started growing their own varieties, and then World War II events put a blockade on trade to European markets. Canada became more of an industrial entity during the time of this industrial revolution, and less of an agricultural nation. Following World War II the United Kingdom entered into contract for a large amount of agricultural commodities such as bacon, cheese, wheat, oats and barley. After the United Kingdom, the United States is Canada's largest external trade partner. Between 1943 and 1953, the average export of Canadian wheat was 347,200,000 bushels (9,449,000 t). The three-year International Wheat Agreement of 1955, which really lasted 6 years, included exports of wheat or flour to 28 of 44 importing countries including Germany, Japan, Belgium, UK, and the Netherlands.

== Agribusiness ==
Agribusiness are activities of food and fibre production and processing which are not part of the farm operation. This would include the production of farm equipment and fertilizers to aid farm production. Agribusiness also includes the firms that purchase the raw goods from the farm for further processing. The meat packing industry, flour mill, and canning industry would be included in the agribusiness sector processing farm products. A recent growth area in agribusiness is the advent of organized farmland investment funds operating on the model of direct land ownership with rental back to farmers as operators.

== Industry categories ==
According to Agriculture and Agri-Food Canada, these are the classifications of Canadian Agriculture Industries.

Canadian Agriculture Industries
Industry	Mainstay
Brewing industry	Comprises two large national beer producing companies: Labatt Breweries of Canada and Molson Coors Canada
Buckwheat industry	Buckwheat flour is used for pancake mixes and pasta. Buckwheat is exported mainly to Japan. The majority of this specialty crop is grown in Manitoba
Canary seed industry	In 2005, Canada produced 77% of the world canary seed production. Over 90 percent of canary seed produced in Canada is from Saskatchewan.
Confectionery and chewing gum industry	Sugar and cocoa are imported for this industry which has foreign owned firms operating in Canada. Various candies amounting to $1.48 billion were shipped in 1997.
Dairy industry	In the Canadian agri-food economy the dairy industry is the third largest.
Dairy genetics industry	The Canadian Record of Performance R.O.P. program discovers dairy cattle of high producing milk capacities. Cattle qualities are monitored by the Canadian Dairy Herd Improvement milk producing agency.(Canadian DHI).
Distillery industry	Canadian whisky made from rye and corn is the main aspect of this Canadian industry. The distillery industry also includes production of whisky, rum, vodka, gin, liqueurs, spirit coolers and basic ethyl alcohol.
Egg industry	Evolved into an automated industry producing table eggs, enzymes, breaker eggs, processed foods, and supporting pullet producers, egg laying chicken (layers) producers and graders.
Fish and seafood industry	This industry produces CDN $5 billion a year. The world's fourth-largest exporter of fish is Canada, from the Atlantic fishery, Pacific fishery and aquaculture sector.
Forage industry	This industry comprises feed for livestock, cattle, sheep and horses. Hay is the main forage crop, supplemented by alfalfa, cereals, peas and corn. Besides domestic markets, exports from Canada arrive at Pacific Rim Countries.
Fruit industry	Tree fruit grower crops consist of apples, pears, peaches, plums, apricots, nectarines, and sweet cherry, followed by wine grape areas. The industry supports fresh, canned, frozen and preserved fruits as well as food production.
Grains and oilseeds industry	Wheat, barley and oats are Canada's grain exports. Canola, soybean and flaxseed are the main oilseed exports.
Grain-based products industry	Grain and oilseed production supports flour milling, malt manufacturing, starch, vegetable fat and oil manufacturing as well as breakfast cereal manufacturing
Hemp industry	Spin off industries from Hemp production include aromatherapy, commercial oil paints, cosmetics, edible oil, garments and accessories, hemp meal and flour, snack foods, shampoo and conditioners, and moisturizers.
Honey industry	Beeswax produces cosmetics, ointments, candles and household waxes. A diet supplement is made from bee pollen. Propolis and royal jelly is used in cosmetics, creams, lotions, tonics and lip balms. Honey is a sweetener for domestic use or commercial food production.
Industrial agriculture (animals)	Factory farming, Intensive pig farming, Integrated Multi-trophic Aquaculture, and shrimp farming are various forms of industrial agriculture which aims at mass production
Industrial agriculture	Includes innovation in agricultural machinery and farming methods, genetic technology, techniques for achieving economies of scale in production, the creation of new markets for consumption, the application of patent protection to genetic information, and global trade
Maple syrup industry	Maple syrup can be used to make maple sugar, maple butter, maple taffy as well as a sweetener.
Mustard seed industry	Yellow mustard is the highest export, closely followed by brown and oriental mustards. It was observed in October 2007 an increase in mustard seed prices, nearly reaching historic levels
Organic industry	Operational certification and standards are challenges for the growing organic farming industry. Organic farming with biodynamics and without synthetic chemicals provides the consumer a holistic plant and animal food choice.
Potato industry	Potato Innovation Network (PIN) 2020 was initiated in 2006 to support development of new markets, and new uses for potatoes in market diversification.
Poultry industry	Avian Influenza ("Bird Flu") is the latest concern in the poultry industry however disease precautions are in place if this strain arrives in Canada.
Processed fruit and vegetable industry	Processing of fruits and vegetables includes consumer products of canned, cider, frozen, jams, jellies and marmalades, pickles, sauces, soups, vegetable and fruit juices and vinegar.
Pulse industry	Beans, chickpeas, faba beans, and lentils comprise the pulse industry. Peas soup, and baked beans are large production processes from pulse growth. The world's largest pulse exporter is Canada.
Red meat industry	This is Canada's fourth major manufacturing industry. Cattle, calves, hogs, sheep, lambs, venison, bison are all domesticated for red meat export and domestic consumption.
Seed industry	Seed growers, field inspectors, registered seed establishments, seed trial plots, and seed retailers are the mainstays of seed production.
Snack food industry	Cereal grains, cornmeal, nuts, oils, potatoes, and seeds are the major ingredients of snack foods such as potato chips, mixed nuts, peanut butter, pork rinds, and seed snacks.
Sunflower seed industry	About 80 per cent sunflowers grown in Canada are sold as roasted snack sunflower seeds or without the shell for baking. The main consumer is domestic. Birdfeed and sunflower vegetable oils are smaller markets which are being developed.
Vegetable industry	The edible portion of a plant is a vegetable. Vegetables can be marketed fresh or as part of the processed fruit and vegetable industry. The greenhouse vegetable industry supports the field vegetable farmer.
Wine industry	Canadian vintners producing wines with unique aromas, aging characteristics and flavours bring in international awards. The grape hybrid from the native Canadian species bred with wine producing grapes results in a grape for a shorter, cooler growing season, and a quality not found elsewhere.

== Agricultural science ==
Agricultural science began developing new styles of farming and strains of wheat and crops so that farming could become a successful venture. Farming methods were developed at places such as Dominion Experimental Farm, Rosthern Experimental Station, and Bell Farm. From 1914 to 1922, the Better Farming Train travelled around rural of Saskatchewan areas educating pioneer farmers. The 1901 census showed 511,100 farms and the number of farms peaked in 1941 at a record 732,800 farms. The Industrial Revolution modernised the farming industry as mechanized vehicles replaced the oxen ploughed land or the horse-drawn cart. Farms became much larger, and mechanized evolving towards industrial agriculture.

== Production ==
Farming activities were very labour-intensive before the industrial revolution and the advent of tractors, combines, balers, etc. From the late 19th century to the mid-20th century, a great percentage of the Canadian labour force was engaged in high labour, smaller farming practices. After mechanization, scientific advancement, improved marketing practices farms became more efficient, larger and less labour-intensive. The labour population was freed up and went to industry, government, transportation, trade and finance. Agriculture, stock raising and horticulture employed one-fourth of the Canadian population according to the 1951 census as well as providing products for exports and Canadian manufacturing concerns.

== Farm equipment ==
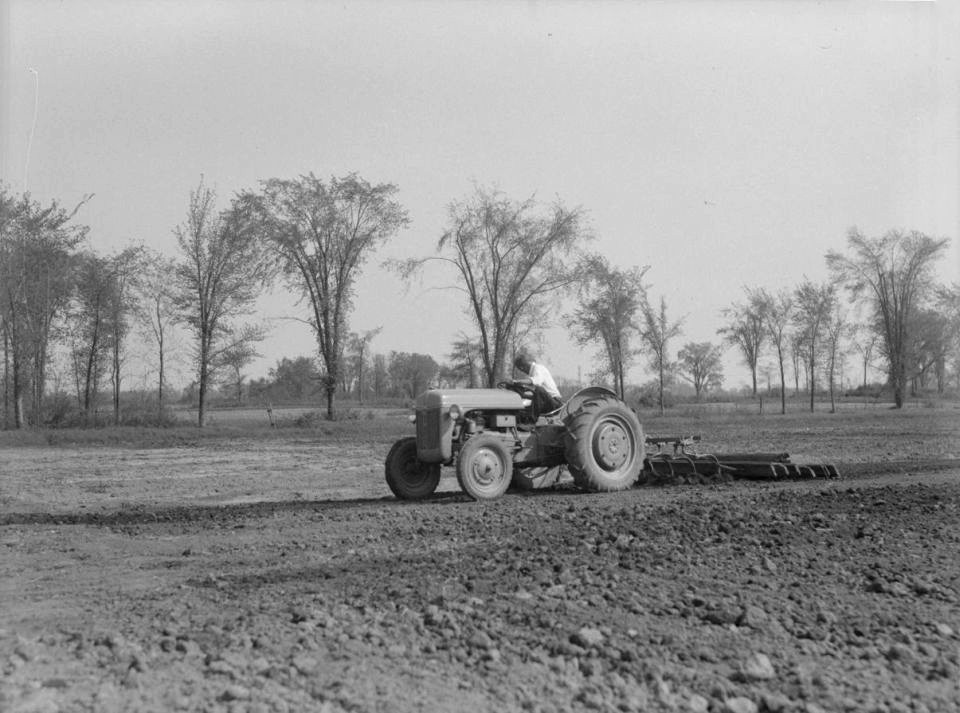
A cultivator pulled by a tractor in Montreal in 1943

The Oliver Chilled Plow, which could cut through the prairie sod, was in use by 1896. Binders which could cut and tie grain for the harvest season and grain elevators for storage were introduced in the late 19th century as well. Plows, tractors, spreaders, combines to name a few are some mechanized implements for the grain crop or horticultural farmer which are labour saving devices. Many Canadian museums such as Reynolds-Alberta Museum will showcase the evolution and variety of farm machinery.

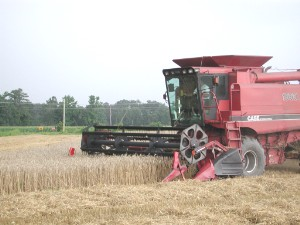
Harvest of Wheat via combine

== Challenges ==
The Great Depression and drought of the Dirty Thirties was devastating. The drought resulted in a mass exodus of population from the prairies, as well as new agricultural practices such as soil conservation, and crop rotation.

The use of soil conservation practices such as crop rotation, cover crops, and windbreaks was expanded following the drought experiences of the dirty thirties. Literally layers and layers of topsoil would be blowing away during this time. Bow River Irrigation Project, Red Deer River Project and the St. Mary Irrigation project of Alberta, were a few of the major projects undertaken by the Prairie Farm Rehabilitation Act (P.F.R.A.) resulting in reservoirs, and distribution systems. A current project is soil liming at the Land Resource Research Institute. Wheat diseases such as wheat bunt and stinking smut can be successfully treated with a fungicide. Disease of plants and animals can break an agricultural producer. Tuberculosis in animals was an early threat, and cattle needed to be tested, and areas accredited in 1956. The newer disease such as chronic wasting disease or transmissible spongiform encephalopathy (TSE) affects both elk and deer. Elk and deer raising is a pioneer field of domestication, has had a setback with this disease. Mad cow disease in cattle and scrapie of sheep are monitored by the Canadian Food Inspection Agency. The poultry sector was plagued by Pullorum disease, and by controlling the flock via poultry husbandry, this disease has been brought under control.

Plants whose traits can be modified to survive a disease or insect have made inroads into Canadian agricultural practices. Cereal rusts which can destroy the majority of areas seeded to wheat, was controlled in 1938 by breeding strains which were rust-resistant. This strain was successful until around 1950, when again a new variety of rust broke out, and again a new species of wheat called Selkirk was developed which was rust resistant. Biotechnology is the center of new research and regulations affecting agriculture this century.

=== Climate change ===
During the drought of 2002, Ontario produced sufficient crops to send hay to those hit the hardest in Alberta. However it is difficult to predict that this would be repeatable in future droughts. The drought caused a deficit in income for farmers resulting from the need to buy heads of cattle at higher prices and sell them for lower prices. Based on historical forecasts alone, makes it difficult to estimate the volume of rain in an upcoming growing season; This does not allow for the agricultural sector to plan accordingly.

In Alberta there has been a trend of high summer temperatures and low summer precipitation. This has led much of Alberta to face drought conditions. Drought conditions are harming the agriculture sector of this province, mainly the cattle ranching area. When there is a drought there is a shortage of feed for cattle (hay, grain). With the shortage on crops ranchers are forced to purchase the feed at the increased prices while they can. Those who cannot afford to pay top money for feed are forced to sell their herds.

== Developmental and educational institutions ==
To increase the viability of agriculture as an economic lifestyle several improvements have been made by various nationwide educational facilities. Inroads and innovations have been made in the diverse fields of agricultural science, agricultural engineering, agricultural soil science, Sustainable agriculture, Agricultural productivity, agronomy, biodiversity, bioengineering, irrigation and swine research for example. Canadian universities conducting agricultural research include McGill University, Dalhousie University, Université Laval, Université de Montréal, University of Alberta, University of British Columbia, University of Calgary, University of Guelph, University of Manitoba, University of Saskatchewan and University of Prince Edward Island. The Ontario Agricultural College is located at the University of Guelph and the Western College of Veterinary Medicine is located at the University of Saskatchewan. The Atlantic Veterinary College is located at the University of P.E.I. and there are also faculties of veterinary medicine at the University of Calgary and Université de Montréal. BC Agriculture in the Classroom Foundation operates in the province of British Columbia.

Examples of some Canadian developmental and educational institutions
Institution	Research Programme
Animal Embryo Biotechnology Laboratory	AEBL researches artificial insemination, embryo biotechnology to improve genetic breeding requirements.
Central Experimental Farm	Scientific research for improvement in agricultural methods and crops. Features the Canada Agriculture Museum, Dominion Arboretum, and Ornamental Gardens.
Cool Climate Oenology and Viticulture Institute	CCOVI provides research to enable the growing grapes and production of wine in cooler climates.
Devonian Botanical Garden	Emphasis on alpine and cold-hardy plants along with wetland ecology, biology of microfungi, horticulture, and phenology research.
Fisheries Centre	Research of aquatic ecosystems and collaboration with Maritime communities, government, and NGOs
List of botanical gardens in Canada	
Northwest Atlantic Fisheries Centre	NAFC is a part of the Canadian research facility of the Science, Oceans and Environment (SOE) branch and Department of Fisheries and Oceans (DFO) provides marine and aquatic research and conservation.
Dalhousie Agricultural Campus	Field and animal husbandry studies, aquaculture, international food business
Ontario Horticultural Association	Regional horticultural associations promote education about horticulture.
Ontario Agriculture College	Education, research and service in agriculture, food, environmental sciences and rural community development.
University of Saskatchewan Agriculture & Bioresources College	Agricultural and bioresource engineering, economics, agronomy, animal Science, environmental science, food and applied microbiological sciences, large animal clinical sciences, plant sciences, and soil science
Vaccine and Infectious Disease Organization	The VIDO facility develops DNA-enhanced immunization vaccines for both humans and animals.
Artificial Insemination Centre of Quebec	Cattle artificial insemination and breeding centre with a focus on improving Quebec's milk producing and beef herds.

== Efforts to achieve food security ==
Canada acknowledges that food insecurity forms one of the critical challenges that not only face a majority of the indigenous people but also other populations. The FAO considers food security as a status in which everyone can access sufficient, safe food to support their dietary needs, according to their preferences for life support.

Canada now serves a critical role in ensuring a reduction of Hunger abroad. The country has formulated strong response mechanisms to ensure everyone benefits from food security. Even though the country went through the 2019 COVID-19 pandemic, it is imperative to understand its success in achieving short-term humanitarian help. Moreover, the government also participated in providing nutrition services, net programs, and food systems programming. All these efforts aim to create strong resilience in the country to create better and stronger systems. Moreover, Canada has an ongoing gender-sensitive nutrition program that supports the most vulnerable and poorest groups in communities. For example, the country ensures that everyone from regions classified as poor and marginalized receives free nutritional food, supportive services related to food, comprehensive nutrition services, and most micronutrients.

Besides, the country seems to focus most of its policies on specific groups of people in society, such as children, women, and those considered to fall within adolescent stages. Canada acknowledges that such groups lack sustainable employment income, while most are still in school learning. The country invested over $890 million to support programs associated with food security. For example, half of this month is directed towards supporting food assistance, while a quarter goes to basic nutrition. The county has also set aside money amounting to $106 million to support areas such as basic nutrition and another $70 million to finance rural agriculture.

== Agricultural clean technology ==
Canada uses clean agricultural technology to create a supportive environment that allows the development and adoption of clean technology. Canada believes that by doing this, the country can benefit from a low-carbon economy and promote sustainable growth in the agri-food sector and the whole agricultural value chain.

Currently, the adoption stream objective involves providing strong support among people living in rural areas to buy and install clean technology. Additionally, the government offers commercial technology that allows businesses to install it in companies that produce high amounts of greenhouse gases, methane, and fertilizers. The move also ensures that future intake remains robust and helps the country reduce greenhouse gases. Additionally, the government emphasizes receiving support for the purposes of measuring the reduction amount when it emits methane at the time of manufacturing fertilizers.

== Local food infrastructural support ==
Canada created the local food infrastructural support program to fund programs that seek to strengthen food security among people. Moreover, the country aims to ensure that people continue to access locally and nutritionally appropriate food across all food production activities—such programs now target groups that require equity, such as Black communities and indigenous groups.

The project's core objectives involve providing ongoing support to most projects happening in rural areas. The country targets ways to ensure a significant improvement in food security. To achieve this initiative, the government of Canada encourages people to install infrastructural equipment that will help them to increase yield, access, nutritional value, and most cultural foods.

== Components of the program ==
The government initiates two support programs—the small-scale programs target at giving funding to communities, capping it at below $25,000. Additionally, the government has categorically stated that it can only support local groups whose objectives focus on addressing priorities in regional food security. Moreover, the group must purchase and install a few pieces of equipment within a single community. Additionally, they maintain that such projects should have an element of production.

On the other hand, the large-scale targets businesses that need at least $150,000 to $500,000. The government uses this program to support corporations with multiple infrastructures. Moreover, the government notes that it can only support corporations that want to address the many challenges facing the local communities.

== Agricultural Museums ==
- Canada Agriculture Museum
- Manitoba Agricultural Museum
- Ross Farm Museum
- Central Experimental Farm
- Ontario Agricultural Museum
- Saskatchewan Western Development Museum

== See also ==
- Canadian Agricultural Safety Association
- Canadian Census of Agriculture
- History of agriculture in Canada
- Pesticides in Canada
