= Economy of Quebec =

- Currency: Canadian dollar (CAD)
- Fiscal year: April 1 to March 31
- Trade organisations: CUSMA, OECD,

Statistics
- GDP: CAD$ 504,5B (2021)
- GDP per capita: CAD$ 52,384 (2018)
- Inflation (CPI): 6.2% (January 2023)
- Population below national poverty line: 6.4% (2020)
- Unemployment: 6.3% (2021)

External
- Exports: C$ 223,3B (2021) goods: 75.7 % services: 24.3 % international: 61,3 % % interprovincial: 38,7 %
- Export goods: aluminium airplanes paper airplane parts copper and alloys
- Main export partners: United States (72.2%); United Kingdom (2.6 %); Germany (2.0 %); France (1.9 %); Netherlands (1.8 %)
- Imports: C$ 234,7B (2021) goods: 75.5 % services: 24.5 % international: 66,3 % interprovincial: 33,7 %
- Import goods: petrol automobiles airplanes trucks and frames
- Main import partners: United States (31.1 %); China (8.3 %); Algeria (8.1 %); United Kingdom (7.9 %); Germany (4.0 %); Japan (4.0 %)

Public finance
- Government debt: $219.0 billion CAD(2021)
- All values, unless otherwise stated, are in US dollars.

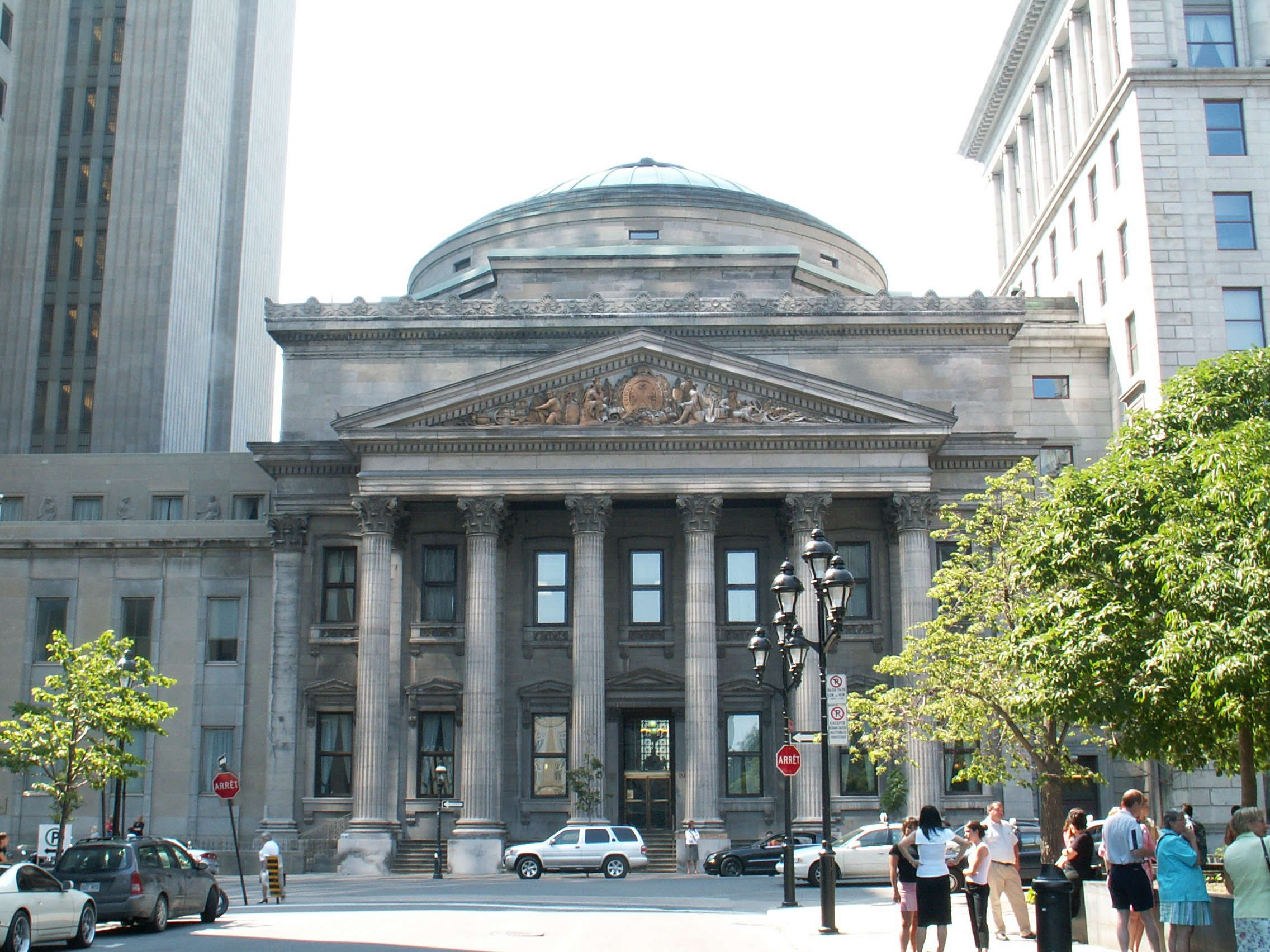
Bank of Montreal headquarters in Old Montreal's Place d'Armes

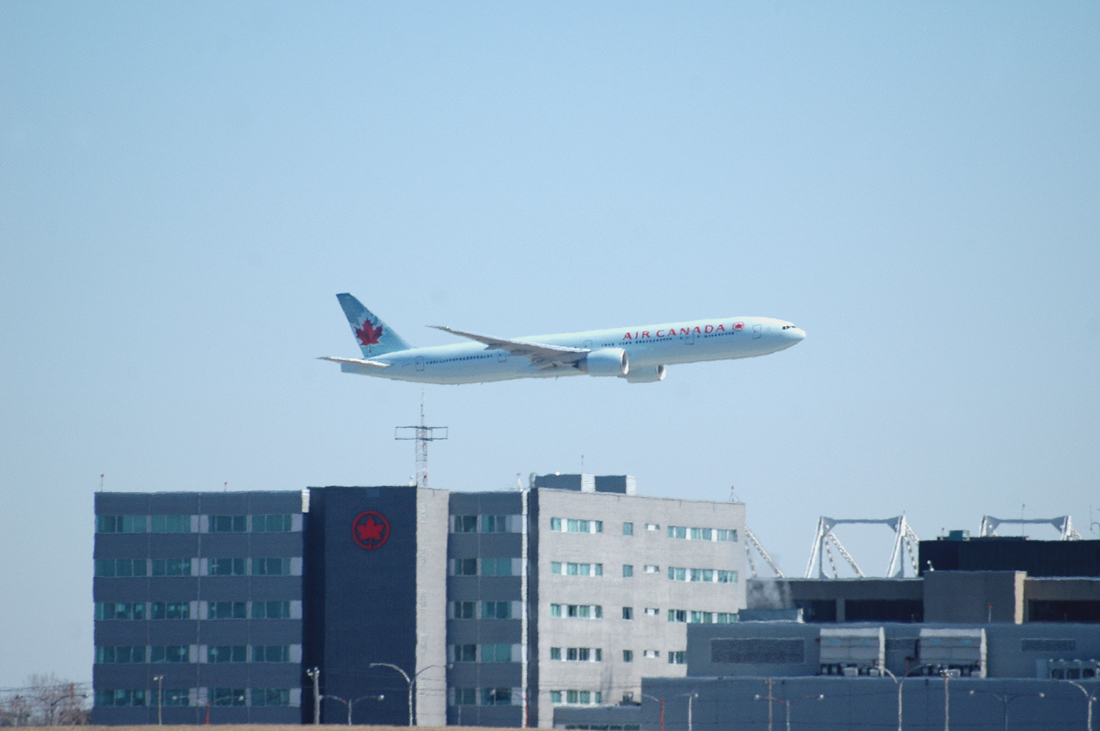
Headquarters of Air Canada

The economy of Quebec is diversified and post-industrial with an average potential for growth. It is highly integrated with the economies of the rest of Canada and the United States. Manufacturing and service sectors dominate the economy.

The economic heart of Quebec is the Montreal metropolitan area where half of Quebecers live. This region alone accounts for 53.4% of the province's gross domestic product (GDP), followed by the Quebec City metropolitan area (11.4%), Gatineau (3.2%), Sherbrooke (2.2%), Saguenay (1.9%) and Trois-Rivières (1.8%). In total, Quebec's GDP at market prices was CAD 381 billion or 19% of Canada's GDP.

For 2022–23, Quebec's budget was C$136.6 billion. This budget planned to provide $8,9 billion more to the healthcare sector over 5 years. Like most industrialized countries, the economy of Quebec is based mainly on the services sector. Quebec's economy has traditionally been fuelled by abundant natural resources, well-developed infrastructure, and average productivity. The provincial GDP in 2021 was C$504,5 billion, making Quebec the second largest economy in Canada after Ontario.

The provincial debt-to-GDP ratio peaked at 50.7% in fiscal year 2012–2013, is now resting at 38.1 in 2022, and is projected to decline to 34% in 2023–2024. The credit rating of Quebec is currently Aa2 according to the Moody's agency. In June 2017, Standard & Poor's (S&P) rated Quebec as an AA− credit risk, surpassing Ontario for the first time.

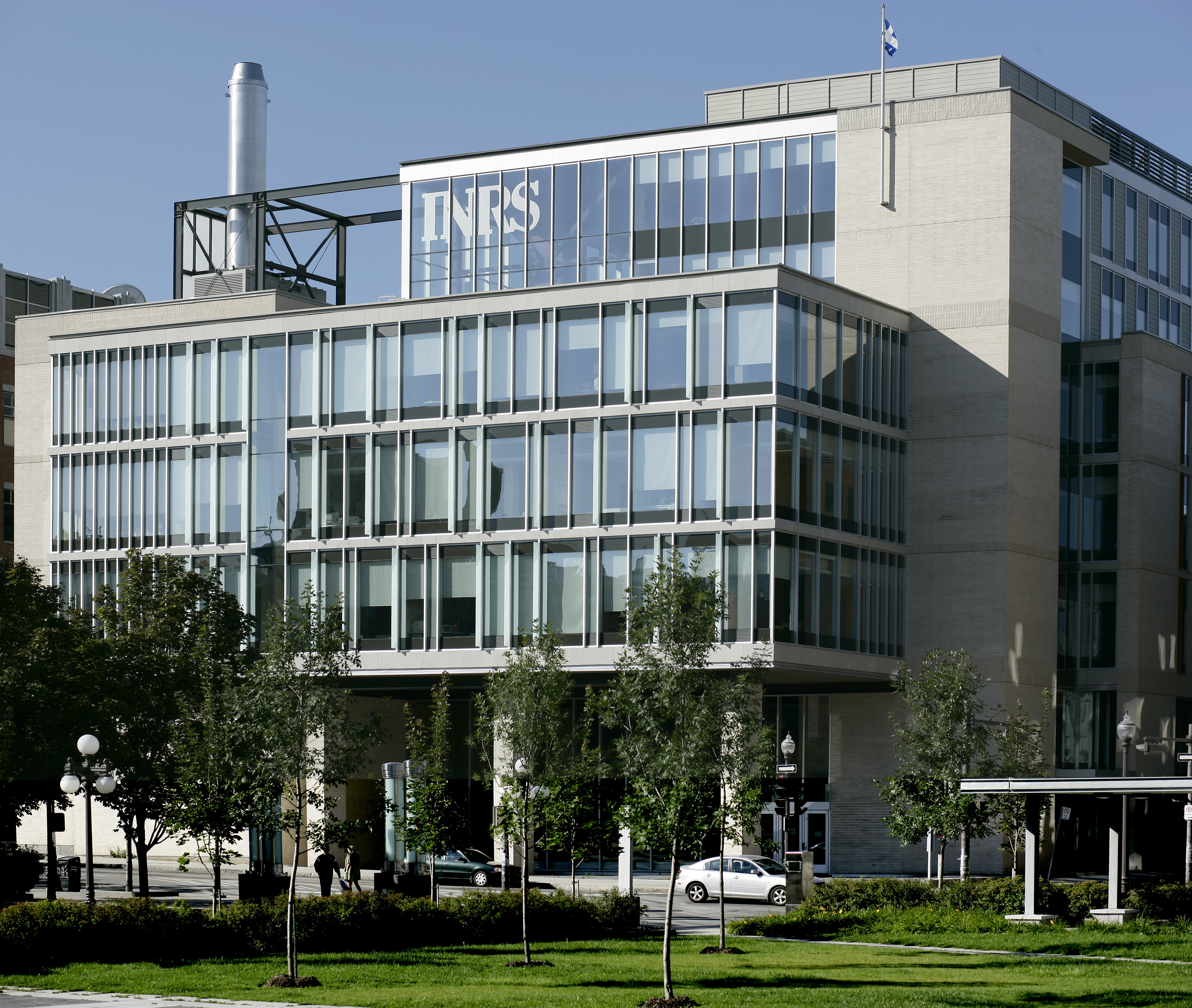
The Institut national de la recherche scientifique helps to advance scientific knowledge and to train a new generation of students in various scientific and technological sectors. More than one million Quebecers work in the field of science and technology which represents more than 30% of Quebec's GDP.

Quebec's economy has undergone tremendous changes. Firmly grounded in the knowledge economy, Quebec has one of the highest growth rate of GDP in Canada. The knowledge sector represents about 31% of Quebec's GDP. In 2011, Quebec experienced faster growth of its research-and-development (R&D) spending than other Canadian provinces. Quebec's spending in R&D in 2021 was equal to C$4.1B or, above the European Union average of 1.8%. The percentage spent on research and technology is the highest in Canada and higher than the averages for the Organisation for Economic Co-operation and Development and G7 countries. Approximately 1.1 million Quebecers work in the field of science and technology.

== Economic policies ==
=== Environmental and energy policy ===
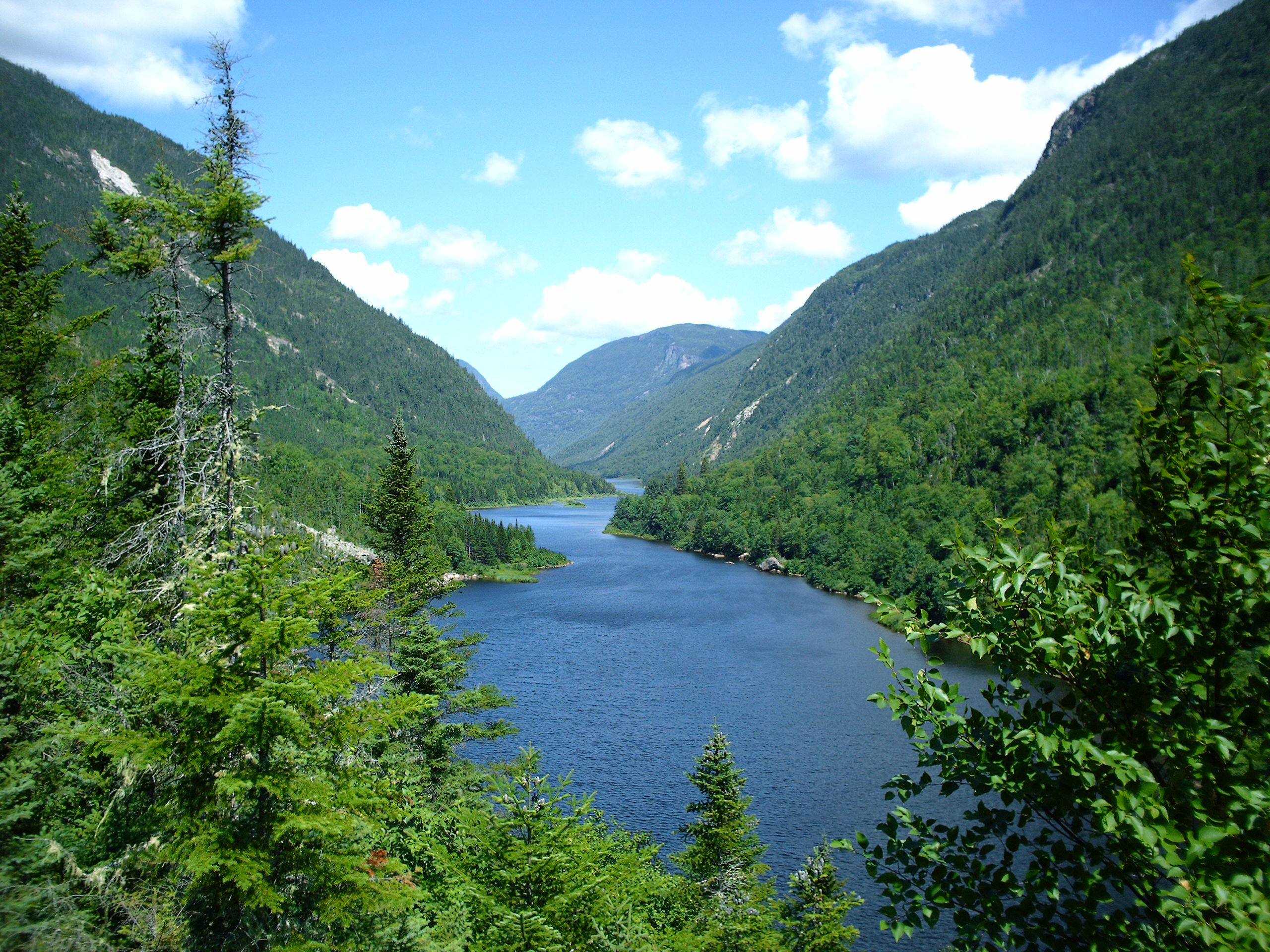
Hautes-Gorges-de-la-Rivière-Malbaie National Park, Malbaie River

Since 2006, Quebec has a green plan in order to achieve the objective of the Kyoto Protocol on climate change. The Ministère du Développement durable, de l'Environnement et des Parcs du Québec (Ministry of Sustainable Development, Environment and Parks) is primarily responsible for implementing environmental policy. For its part, the Société des établissements de plein air du Québec (SEPAQ) is the lead agency for the management of national parks and wildlife reserves. Quebec currently protects nearly 8.12% (135,326 km^{2}) of its territory. The first protected area was the creation of Mt. Royal Park in 1876 followed by the Mont-Tremblant National Park in 1894.

The Quebec government has been working to introduce the electric car since 1994, including contributing financing for technologies such as the TM4 MФTIVE, an electric motor designed and manufactured in Quebec. Hydro-Québec has recently tested more than 50 i-MiEV in order to gradually introduce the charging stations across the province. This is the largest pilot test of electric cars in Canada. Quebec was the first province in Canada to allow the ZENN car to drive on the roads. During the inaugural speech of 2011, Jean Charest announced five priorities for the next 30 years including the Plan Nord and called for a revolution in electric cars.

On November 23, 2009, Premier Jean Charest announced targets for reducing greenhouse gases during the United Nations Climate Change Conference in Copenhagen. Quebec will cut its emissions by 20% by the year 2020 compared to international reference of 1990. On January 14, 2010, a new law came into force to reduce greenhouse gases from automobiles which represent 40% of Quebec GHGs. This new law stipulates that car manufacturers serving the territory of Quebec must meet an emission ceiling of 187 grams of GHG/km or approximatively 7.7 L/100 km. This level must be reduced annually up to 127 grams of GHG/km or approximatively 5.3 L/100 km in 2016. These standards are as stringent as those in California (United States), according to the Government of Quebec. The provincial government plans to offer up to $8,000 rebate towards the purchase of an electric car. The government hopes that by 2020, a quarter of cars purchased in Quebec will be electric. The plan would position Quebec as a world leader in electrified transportation according to Jean Charest.

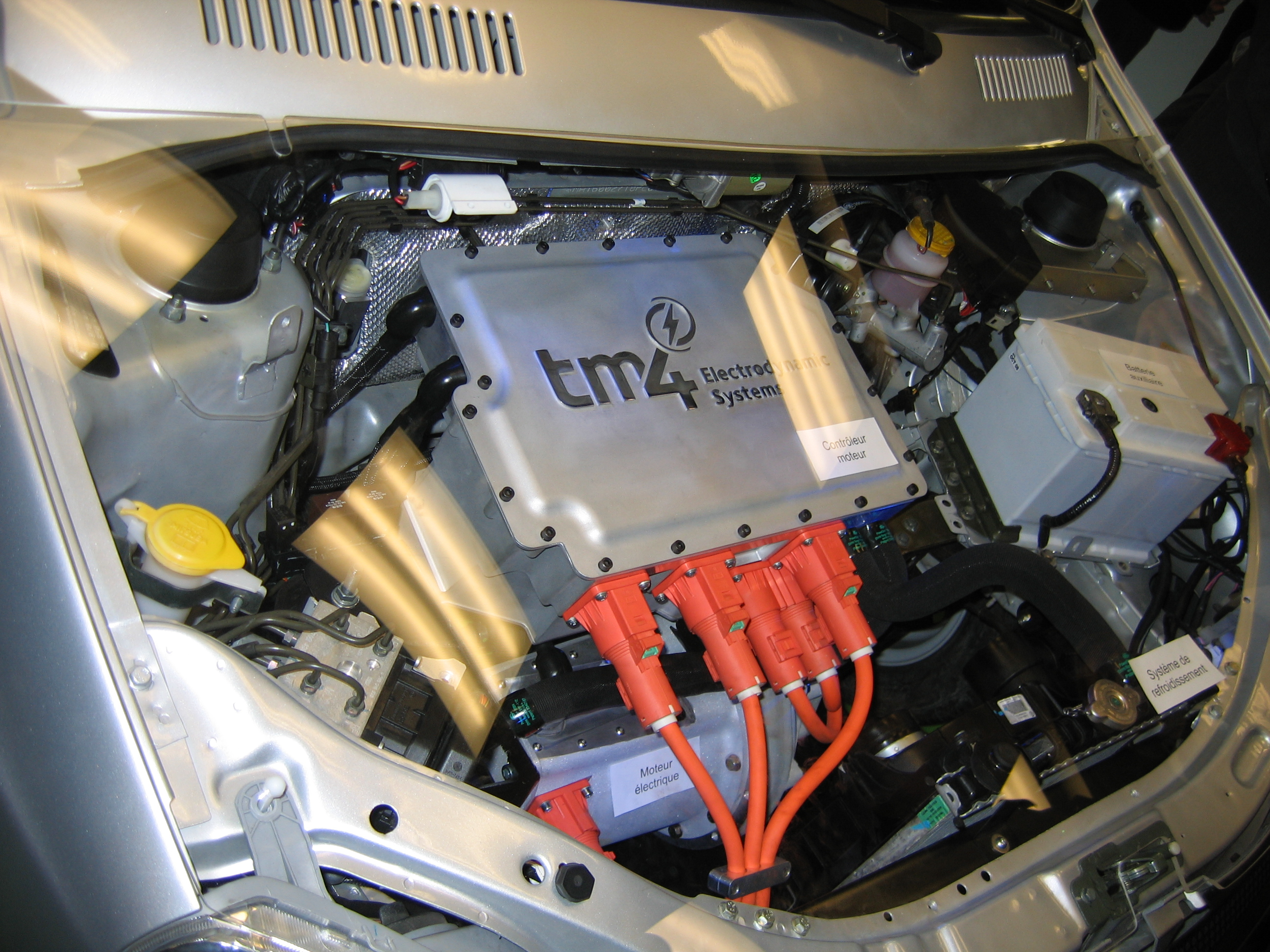
Tata Indica EV engine bay featuring TM4 MФTIVE electric motor

Quebec became the first region in North America to set a carbon tax. Since 2007, consumers pay a special tax on gasoline. Since July 2011, Quebec has imposed a carbon tax that affect more than 85% of industries in the province. This tax will be mandatory from 2013. The sectors affected by this carbon tax will have to reduce their carbon dioxide below 25 000 kilotonnes per year. Only the forest industry, agriculture and waste industries are not affected by this tax. In addition, the Quebec government plans to recover 60% of putrescible organic matter by 2015 in order to reduce its emissions. Quebec climate policy has been harshly criticised by the federal government under Prime minister Stephen Harper. In 2010, former minister Jim Prentice has openly criticized Quebec's plan to set GHG standards for motor vehicles sold in the province, describing it as "lunatic". However, ten months later, Prentice successor, John Baird, has praised Quebec as a world leader in GHG abatement.

=== Electric vehicles ===
Quebec is a leader in the transition to electric vehicles (EVs) in Canada and beyond. According to the latest data from Statistics Canada, Quebec had the highest number of EV registrations in the first quarter of 2022, with 7,522 vehicles. This accounted for 9.2% of the total new vehicle registrations in the province. Quebec was followed by Ontario, with 5,688 EV registrations (4.2% of total) and British Columbia, with 5,385 EV registrations (12.5% of total). The latter number includes the territories.

Quebec also led the country in EV market share for the whole year of 2022, with 36.7% of new vehicle registrations being electric. Ontario was second, with 31.5%, and B.C. was third, with 23.9%. These three provinces accounted for over 90% of the total EV registrations in Canada in 2022. Quebec's high EV market share can be attributed to several factors, such as its abundant hydroelectricity, its rich mineral resources, its strong government support, and its competitive fuel economy and cost.

The province has set ambitious targets to achieve carbon neutrality by 2050, put 1.5 million EVs on the road in Quebec by 2030, and electrify 55% of city buses and 65% of school buses by 20301. To support these goals, the Quebec government has announced various measures in the recent budget for 2022–2023.

One of these measures is a reduction in rebates available for the purchase of EVs, from $8,000 to $6,000 for new vehicles and from $4,000 to $3,000 for used vehicles. This decision reflects the growing demand and affordability of EVs in the province, as well as the need to ensure the sustainability of the program. However, the government has also allocated new funds for EV charging infrastructure and building out the province's EV battery supply chain.

Federal Energy and Natural Resources Minister Jonathan Wilkinson announced nearly $30 million in funding for the installation of more than 1,500 new electric vehicle (EV) charging stations in Quebec. The Quebec government announced that they are adding more than 116,000 additional charging stations to the province by investing more than $514 million over the next five years (2023–2028). This will increase the accessibility and convenience of EV charging for drivers and reduce range anxiety across the province.

=== Battery supply chain ===
Quebec has the potential to become a major player in the electric vehicle (EV) industry, due to its strategy to develop a domestic battery supply chain. The province has several advantages, such as abundant hydroelectricity, rich mineral resources, as well as government support, that make it an attractive destination for EV battery manufacturing and related activities.

The Quebec government has been actively promoting the adoption of EVs in the province and has allocated new funds for EV charging infrastructure and battery supply chain development. Investissement Québec, the province's investment arm, acts as a venture capitalist and provides substantial backing for critical mineral projects, giving a vote of confidence and enticing private capital. The province's battery sector development strategy, the Stratégie québécoise de développement de la filière batterie, aims to develop a comprehensive battery supply chain in Quebec by acting as a catalyst for the sector's value chain.

Quebec has also attracted several major investments from global players in the battery industry. For instance, Northvolt has confirmed its joining Canada's EV battery manufacturing ecosystem with a 170-hectare, $7-billion, 60 GWh-capacity site, enough to power roughly one million EVs a year, that will provide 3,000 jobs in the McMasterville and Saint-Basile-le-Grand area. Ford Motor Co and Korean companies EcoProBM and SK On have announced that they will build a C$1.2 billion ($887 million) plant to produce EV battery materials in Becancour. BASF has announced that it plans to build a factory in Quebec to produce cathode active materials with production expected to start by 2025. Finally, the governments of Quebec and Canada are working closely with Volta Energy Solutions Canada Inc. (VESC) on the establishment of a new copper foil facility in Granby. Copper foils are a core, high-value component in EV batteries, and this new installation will yet again reinforce Canada and Quebec's position as a key destination for the future of EV manufacturing.

These initiatives will help Quebec achieve its goal of developing its own complete domestic battery ecosystem and supporting clean technologies. Quebec is poised to become a leader in the EV industry and contribute to the global transition towards a low-carbon economy.

== Most productive sectors ==
=== Aerospace ===
Québec is one of the world's top three aerospace capitals, along with Seattle and Toulouse. It has major contractors, leading technical centres and world-class equipment manufacturers in this sector. Québec's aerospace industry employs over 36,000 people, mostly in the Montréal area, which is home to one of the world's largest aerospace clusters. It also has a strong presence in other regions, such as Québec City, Saguenay–Lac-Saint-Jean, Estrie and Mauricie. Québec's aerospace industry is recognized for its innovative drive and creativity. It invests over $700 million in R&D annually, which represents 70% of Canada's aerospace R&D spending. It has close ties with universities, technical colleges and research centres that train and support the next generation of aerospace professionals. Montreal boasts a wide array of airlines, manufacturers, and international organizations. It hosts the headquarters of Air Canada (the flagship airline of Canada) and Bombardier (the world's third largest aircraft manufacturer). Additionally, jet engine companies Pratt & Whitney and Rolls-Royce Canada, defence contractor Lockheed Martin and L-3 Communications, flight simulator builder CAE, helicopter manufacturer Bell Helicopter and SITA have a significant presence in and around the city. Since Montreal is located in the heart of a vast free trade zone governed by the former North American Free Trade Agreement (NAFTA), now called the USMCA, it gives companies access to a market of about 500 million consumers worldwide. Various international organisations have established their headquarters in Quebec, notably the International Air Transport Association and the International Civil Aviation Organization.

=== Video games ===
Quebec is home to over 280 studios, making it one of the top five game development hubs in the world. Canada has around 937 active studios, meaning Quebec accounts for over one-quarter of the country's total game dev workforce. On top of that, the study notes that 86 percent of the studios are Quebec-owned. This means that for all of the big-name international companies that have locations in Quebec, including Ubisoft (Assassin's Creed), Warner Bros. (Gotham Knights) and EA (Dead Space), there are many more that are independent or locally owned, including Behaviour (Dead by Daylight), Sabotage (Sea of Stars), Red Barrels (Outlast) and Manavoid (Rainbow Billy). Besides lucrative tax credits to encourage game development in the province, the study notes that the province's links to both the United States and Europe, as well as high standards of living and multiculturalism, help make it a natural location for expansion. For example, Ubisoft Montreal, one of the oldest and biggest game development studios in the world, opened in the province in 1997 as an expansion to Ubisoft's early France-based operations. Behaviour was another early key player in the Quebec gaming industry in the '90s.

=== Artificial Intelligence ===
Quebec is a province that has embraced artificial intelligence as a key driver of innovation and economic growth. Its financial capital city, Montreal, is home to a thriving AI ecosystem that includes the world's largest concentration of academic researchers in deep learning at Mila, the Quebec artificial intelligence institute. Led by renowned experts such as Yoshua Bengio, Joelle Pineau, Hugo Larochelle, and Irina Rish, Mila collaborates with industry partners and government agencies to advance AI research and applications for the common good and ethics. Montreal is also a global hub for artificial intelligence research with many companies involved in this sector, such as Facebook AI Research (FAIR), Microsoft Research, Google Brain, DeepMind, Samsung Research and Thales Group (cortAIx). The city also hosts Scale AI, Canada's AI global innovation cluster that funds and supports AI projects for supply chains, and IVADO, a unique institute that connects researchers and businesses to develop AI solutions. Quebec's AI industry has attracted major investments from the Canadian government, such as the Canada First Research Excellence Fund, and from global companies, such as Google, Facebook, Microsoft, and IBM. Quebec's AI industry benefits from a strong foundation in academic excellence. Several world-renowned universities, including the Université de Montréal and McGill University, have established themselves as leading centers for AI research. These institutions have been instrumental in nurturing top AI talent, which has played a crucial role in the industry's growth.

=== Engineering ===
The engineering industry in Quebec is one of the most important and influential sectors in the province's economy and society. It has a long and rich history that dates back to the colonial era, when engineers played a key role in building and developing the infrastructure and public works of the region. Since then, the engineering industry in Quebec has evolved and diversified, offering a wide range of services and expertise in various fields such as transportation, energy, environment, construction, and manufacturing.

Quebec is home to many engineering firms that operate locally and internationally, providing consulting, design, project management, and construction services to clients from different sectors and regions. Some of the largest and most prominent engineering firms in Quebec are WSP Global and AtkinsRéalis (formerly SNC- Lavalin), both headquartered in Montreal. These two firms have been involved in some of the most iconic and complex projects in the world, such as the Samuel De Champlain Bridge, the Réseau express métropolitain, the Line at NEOM, the Marina Bay Sands, Shanghai Tower, One World Trade Center and the Taiwan High Speed Rail line.

=== Finance ===
The Finance, insurance, real estate and leasing industry employs 218,000 people, including the largest money manager in Canada, Caisse de dépôt et placement du Québec. The Bank of Montreal, founded in 1817 in Montreal, was Quebec's first bank but, like many other large banks, its central branch is now in Toronto. Several banks remain under Quebecois control, including the National Bank of Canada, the Desjardins Group and the Laurentian Bank.

=== Transportation ===
Quebec's ground transportation industry generated $7.2 billion in revenue at the beginning of 2004. It employs some 35,000 people and includes major original equipment manufacturers such as Bombardier, Paccar, Nova Bus, Prévost CAR, Komatsu International, and many suppliers and sub-contractors.

Quebec has eight deepwater ports for merchandise shipping, and in 2003 9.7 million tons of merchandise was carried by 3,886 cargo ships through the Saint Lawrence Seaway. The income created by this traffic is over $90 million per annum.

The Port of Montreal is the second biggest container handling port in Canada. Located on one of the largest navigable rivers in the world, the Saint Lawrence River, it is the third largest port in northeastern North America. Annual revenues of about $2 billion are created, along with 17,600 direct and indirect jobs.

Besides Montreal, other deepwater ports are located in Trois-Rivières and Bécancour, as well as in Sorel-Tracy, Baie-Comeau, Port-Cartier and Sept-Îles. The last four ports specialise in handling bulk cargo and heavy merchandise.

=== Information technology ===
Quebec's information technology employed over 100,000 workers in 2008. Of the total Canadian venture capital funding 52% is managed in Quebec with 61% of available funds invested in technology. Sectors of note include telecommunications, multimedia software, computer services and consulting, microelectronics and components. Its largest city,

Some 10,000 people work for 115 telecommunication companies such as Bell Canada, Ericsson, Motorola, and Mitec.

The multimedia sector was enhanced by Electronic Arts in 2003. Some 11,000 people work for game development companies such as Ubisoft, Microïds, Strategy First, A2M, and Eidos Interactive.

Montreal has two major creators of 3D animation software: Softimage and Autodesk Media and Entertainment Division.

The computer services, software development, and consulting branch employs 60,000 specialized workers.

The microelectronics sector has 110 companies employing 12,900 people.

=== Optics and photonics ===
In 2004, some 8000 people were employed in the Quebec optics and photonics industries. Research-related jobs are concentrated chiefly in the seven Quebec City region research centres, while production operations are mostly located in the Greater Montreal area. Quebec counts some 20 businesses in the laser, optical fibre, image processing, and related sectors.

=== Biotechnology ===
The biotechnology sector in Quebec includes more than 450 companies and organizations. Employing over 25,000 individuals and generating $5.6 billion in annual revenues, it encompasses a diverse array of players, from multinationals to small and medium-sized enterprises, research institutes, universities, and healthcare institutions.

Global players, including Pfizer, Moderna, Novartis, and Merck, have strategically established their roots within Quebec's borders. Pfizer stands tall in Quebec with its Canadian headquarters nestled in Kirkland, alongside other offices in Montreal, Mississauga, and Brandon. Pfizer's legacy in developing small molecules, vaccines, and biologics extends across diverse therapeutic areas, from oncology to rare diseases and immunology. Moderna, a biotech firm, has chosen Quebec as the site for its first-ever plant outside the United States. Novartis boasts a significant Quebec presence through its divisions, including Novartis Pharmaceuticals Canada Inc., with headquarters in Kirkland and a Toronto location. Quebec is also home to Sandoz Canada Inc., a generic drug manufacturing subsidiary with an office in Boucherville. Finally, Merck, a global biopharmaceutical juggernaut, maintains two critical divisions in Canada. Merck Canada Inc., headquartered in Kirkland, reinforces Quebec's position in the biotechnology landscape, while Merck Frosst Canada Ltd. in Montreal serves as a pivotal research and development center.

=== Health industry ===
With 381 companies and 24,550 employees in the pharmaceutical, research and development, manufacturing, and related sectors, the Quebec health industry is an important economic stimulus for modern Quebec. With the presence of some 20 multinationals such as Merck, Johnson & Johnson, Pfizer, Aventis, Novartis, Valeant, Galderma. GlaxoSmithKline and Bristol-Myers Squibb, Montreal ranks top ten in North America for the number of jobs in the pharmaceutical sector.

=== Tourism ===
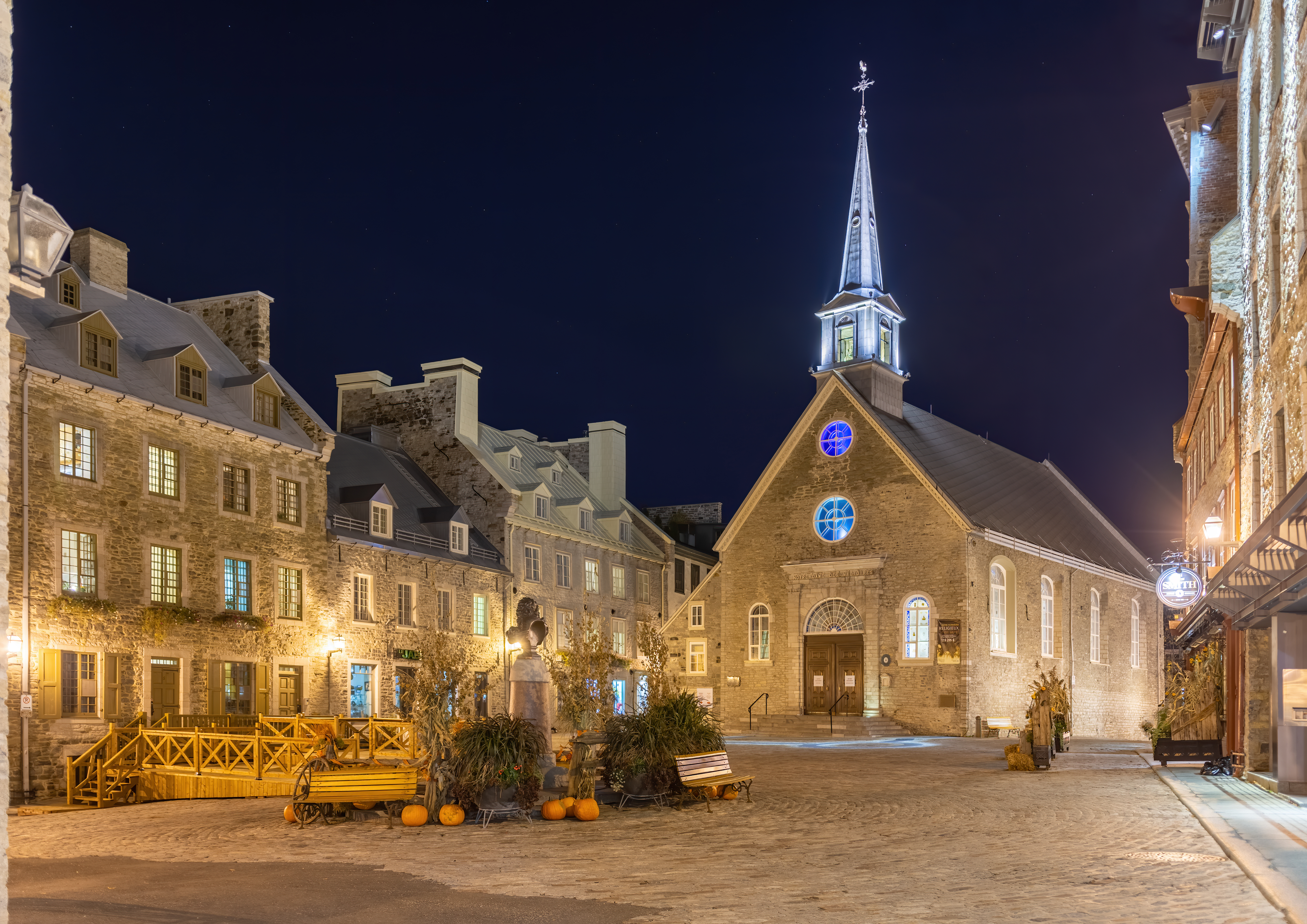
Notre-Dame-des-Victoires, Basse-Ville

Tourism plays an important role in the economy of Quebec. Tourism represents 2.5% of Quebec's GDP and nearly 400,000 people are employed in the tourism sector. Nearly 30,000 businesses are related to this industry, of which 70% are located outside of Montreal and Quebec City. In 2011, Quebec welcomed 26 million foreign tourists, most of them from the United States, France, the United Kingdom, Germany, Mexico and Japan.

The province of Quebec has 22 tourist regions, each of which presents its geography, its history and culture. The capital, Quebec City, is the only fortified city in North America and has its own European cachet. The oldest Francophone city in North America, Quebec City was named a World Heritage Site by UNESCO in 1985 and has celebrated its 400th anniversary in 2008. Montreal is the only Francophone metropolis in North America and also the second largest Francophone city after Paris in terms of population. This major centre of 4 million inhabitants is a tapestry of cultures from the world over with its many neighbourhoods, including Chinatown, the Latin Quarter, the Gay Village, Little Italy, Le Plateau-Mont-Royal, the Quartier International and Old Montreal. Montreal has a rich architectural heritage, along with many cultural activities, sports events and festivals.

The province of Quebec has over 400 museums including the Musée des beaux-arts de Montréal, which is the oldest museum in Canada and one of the most important art institutions. It is Montreal's largest museum and is amongst the most prominent in Canada.

Quebec is also a religious tourism destination. The Basilique Sainte-Anne-de-Beaupré and Oratoire Saint-Joseph du Mont-Royal are the most popular religious site in the province. In 2005, the Oratory was added to the List of National Historic Sites of Canada on the occasion of its 100th anniversary. Quebec has over 130 church and Cathedrals. All of which bear witness to the many origins that colonized the region.

In 2003, tourism-related expenditures amounted to C$7.3 billion. Some 27.5 million trips were made in Quebec, 76% of which were made by Quebecers themselves, 13% by other Canadians, 8% from the United States and 3% from other countries. Almost 330,000 people are employed in the tourism sector, working in over 34,000 businesses. Quebec is listed among the top 20 best tourist destinations in the world, and the City of Quebec is the only fortified city in North America north of Mexico.

The most visited cities are Montreal and Quebec City, although a sizeable number also visit the city of Gatineau in the west, which forms part of the federal National Capital Region (Ottawa).

=== Energy ===
Unlike most other regions of the world, Quebec stands out for its use of renewable energy. In 2008, electricity (more than 99% of which came from renewable energy sources) ranked as the main form of energy used in Quebec (41.6%), followed by oil (38.2%) and natural gas (10.7%).

Quebec produces most of Canada's hydroelectricity and is the 2nd biggest hydroelectricity producer in the world (2019) Because of this, Quebec has been described as a potential renewable energy superpower. In 2019, Quebec's electricity production amounted to 214 terawatt-hours (TWh), 95% of which comes from hydroelectric power stations, and 4.7% of which come from wind energy. Thermal electricity production is almost completely absent from Quebec, except for a few power stations exploiting forest biomass or diesel generators which supply some twenty remote communities.

The public company Hydro-Québec occupies a dominant position in the production, transmission and distribution of electricity in Quebec. Hydro-Québec operates 63 hydroelectric power stations and 28 large reservoirs; they guarantee a stable and flexible supply which adjusts according to demand. Because of the remoteness of Hydro-Québec's TransÉnergie division, with its main facilities located in James Bay and on the Côte-Nord, the TransÉnergie division operates the largest electricity transmission network in North America. Their network includes 34,361 km of lines and 17 interconnections with neighbouring markets, allowing for the export of 38.3 TWh in 2018 alone.

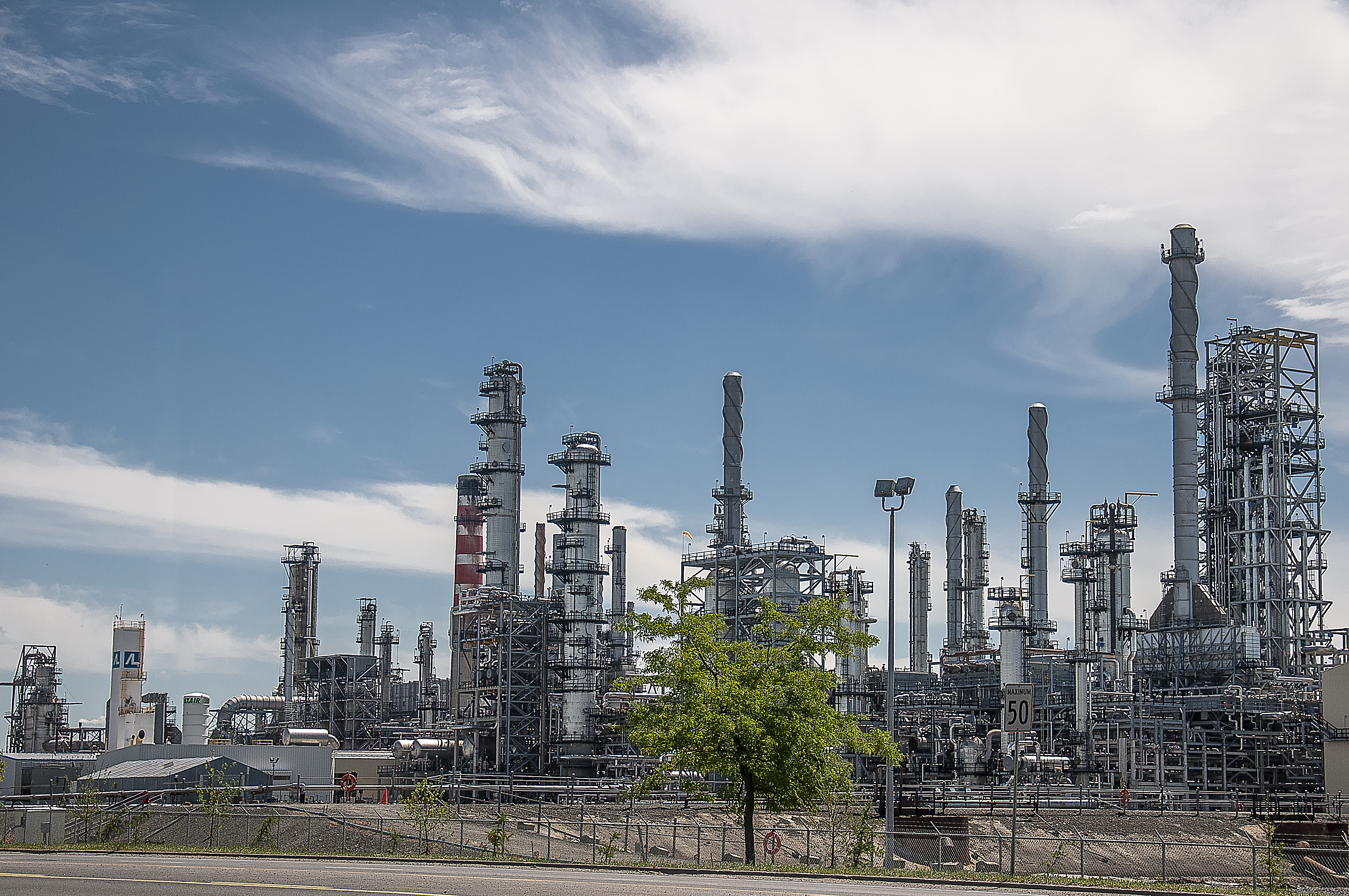
The Valero refinery in Lévis

As Quebec has few significant deposits of fossil fuels, all hydrocarbons are imported. Refiners' sourcing strategies have varied over time and have depended on market conditions. In the 1990s, Quebec purchased much of its oil from the North Sea. Since 2015, it now consumes almost exclusively the crude produced in western Canada and the United States. Quebec's two active refineries (Valero's in Lévis, and Suncor's in Montreal) have a total capacity of 402,000 barrels per day, which is greater than local needs, which stood at 365,000 barrels per day in 2018. In 2021, an Ipsos poll found that 43% of Quebecers want their province to develop its own oil resources instead of continuing to import all the oil consumed in the province.

The natural gas consumed in Quebec arrives through the TC Energy transmission network. Since 2016, Quebec's main natural gas distributor, the Énergir company, has been getting its supply at the Dawn reception point in southwestern Ontario, instead of at its previous main source the Empress intersection in Alberta. This change has occurred because of an increase in the non-traditional production of shale gas in North America, stimulating competition between the different supply basins operated across the continent. In 2018, 86% of natural gas came from Dawn and 12% from Empress. The rest consists of injections of natural gas produced locally by the recovery of residual materials.

=== Agriculture ===
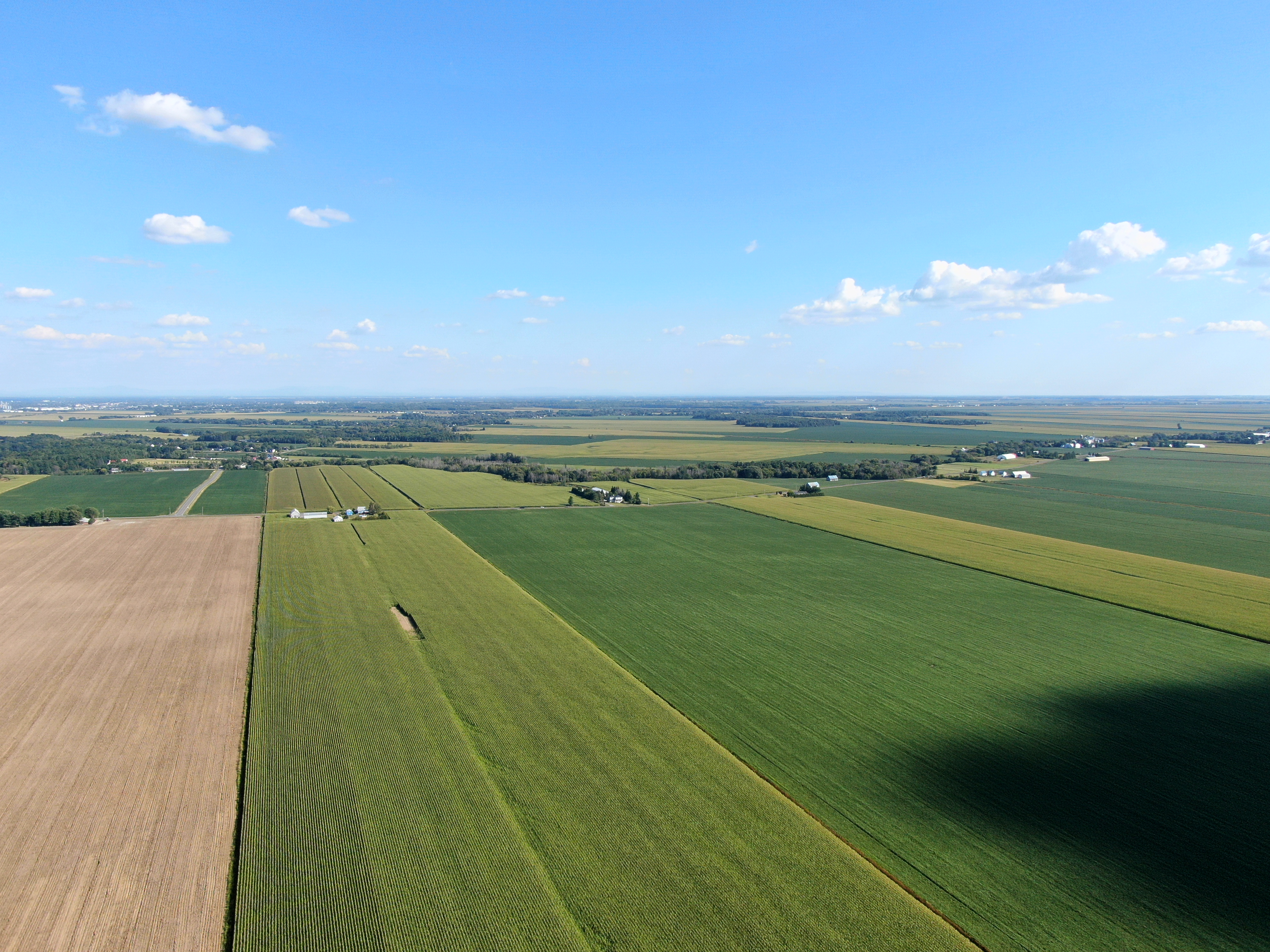
Farmland in Montérégie

The combination of rich and easily arable soils and relatively warm climate make the St. Lawrence River Valley Quebec's most prolific agricultural area. Throughout the province, there are 29,380 farm enterprises and 42,265 farmers. It produces meat, dairy products, fruit, vegetables, foie gras, maple syrup (of which Quebec is the world's largest producer), fish, and livestock. In Quebec, agricultural land accounts for only 2% of the province's total land area. In France, the figure is 58%, whereas in the United States, it is 45%.

Sugar maples face many pests and diseases. Among caterpillars the Bruce spanworm, Forest tent caterpillar, and Gypsy moth are most severe. Among fungal diseases the greatest impact is due to Eutypella canker (E. parasitica) and Nectria canker (N. galligena), and Armillaria ostoyae root disease, Hardwood Trunk Rot, and Tar spot are also significant.

The agri-food industry plays an important role in the economy of Quebec, with meat and dairy products being the two main sectors. It accounts for 8% of the Quebec's GDP and generates $19.2 billion. This industry generated 487,000 jobs in agriculture, fisheries, manufacturing of food, beverages and tobacco and food distribution. Quebec is in 1st place for the highest amount of milk produced and biggest amount of farms engaged in the dairy industry (2019). Animal production accounts for more than half of all farms in Quebec. Dairy production is the province's most important, accounting for 57% of farm enterprises and 26% of income. It is followed by hog production, which accounts for 15% of total revenue. The most major agricultural output is grain maize (for livestock).

Quebec's exports of food products increased by 75% between 1999 and 2002, reaching $3.6 billion. In 2002, more than 150 countries imported these products, 88% of them with three partners: the United States (75.1%), the European Union (5.5%) and Japan (7.4%). The most exported products are pork, various food preparations, and various agricultural and food products.

Quebec sells its products to the Eastern and Asian markets in such large quantities that China is now the second country (after the United States) that imports the most Quebec products with 4% of Quebec exports.

In Quebec, agricultural activities generated $9.1 billion in product sales revenue. The regions of Montérégie (30%), Chaudière-Appalaches (18%), and Centre-du-Québec (14%), account for 61% of total revenue.

Both the Orange Wheat Blossom Midge and Fusarium graminearum are present here. Individually they can be severe on wheat, but even moreso, the midge is a vector of the fungus.

Strawberry and raspberry growers are represented by the Strawberry and Raspberry Growers Association^{[fr]} (APFFdQ).

36% of the country's strawberries are grown here, the highest for any province or territory. APFFdQ recommends cultivars for the province:

Recommended varieties and their dates of harvest/availability to consumers
Clery	end of May	end of June
Wendy	end of May	end of June
Veestar	end of May	end of June
Annapolis	end of May	end of June
Honeyoye	end of May	end of June
Jewel	June	July
Kent	June	July
Chambly	June	July
Bounty	June	July
Darselect	June	July
Malwina	June	July
Seascape		until mid-October
Albion		until mid-October
Yamaska		Late season
AAC Généreuse		mid-season
AAC Sens		late season
AAC Dynamik	ripening very early to early in season,	Day Neurral
Saint-Pierre		late season

For raspberry varieties APFFdQ recommends Boyne, Killarney, Festival, Nova, Tulameen, Pathfinder, Polana.

=== Forestry ===
North of the St. Lawrence River Valley, the territory of Quebec has significant resources in its coniferous forests, lakes, and rivers. These include pulp, paper, and lumber. More than half of Quebec (nearly 900,000 km2) is covered in forests, a size nearly twice that of Sweden.

The pulp and paper industry generates annual shipments valued at more than $14 billion. The forest products industry ranks second in exports, with shipments valued at almost $11 billion. It is also the main, and in some circumstances only, source of manufacturing activity in more than 250 municipalities in the province. The forest industry has slowed in recent years because of the softwood lumber dispute. This industry employs 68,000 people in several regions of Quebec. This industry accounted for 3.1% of Quebec's GDP. In 2020, it accounted for 8% of Quebec's exports, nearly $12 billion of forest products each year, the second largest amount of any province.

Quebec has renewable forest resources extending over an area of nearly 760,000 square kilometres (290,000 sq mi) and generating an annual allowable cut of about 55 cubic metres (72 yd^{3}) million. In 2021, a study concluded that only 1% of Quebec's forests are harvested each year.

=== Mining ===
Québec has immense mining potential, and in 2021, it was the second highest mineral-producing province by value at $11.9 billion, coming second to British Columbia ($12.9 billion). The Abitibi also has the world's largest Archean volcano-sedimentary belt and is known for its gold, copper, zinc, and silver resources. Québec develops 17 metals and 12 nonmetals, giving it Canada's most diverse resource base. Without including corporate income tax, the Québec government received $1.3 billion in 2018, while the Government of Canada received an extra $500 million through mining activities.

Approximately 30 minerals are mined, with the most important being iron, gold, nickel, titanium, niobium, zinc, copper, silver, and stone. In 2010, the province was the largest producer of zinc in Canada and the second largest producer of gold and iron. The province is also the world's second-largest producer of niobium and the third of titanium dioxide. The Renard diamond mine operated between 2014 and 2023, owned by Stornaway Diamonds. As of 2024, after Stornoway filed for bankruptcy protection, Australian-owned Winsome Resources has made efforts to purchase the mine, with the intention of repurposing it as a lithium processing plant. The world's largest greenfield phosphate reserve is in Lac à Paul. The province has 27 mines, around 200 exploration firms, and 12 primary processing plants. In 2010 the value of mineral shipments from the province was about $6.8 billion.

== Imports and exports ==
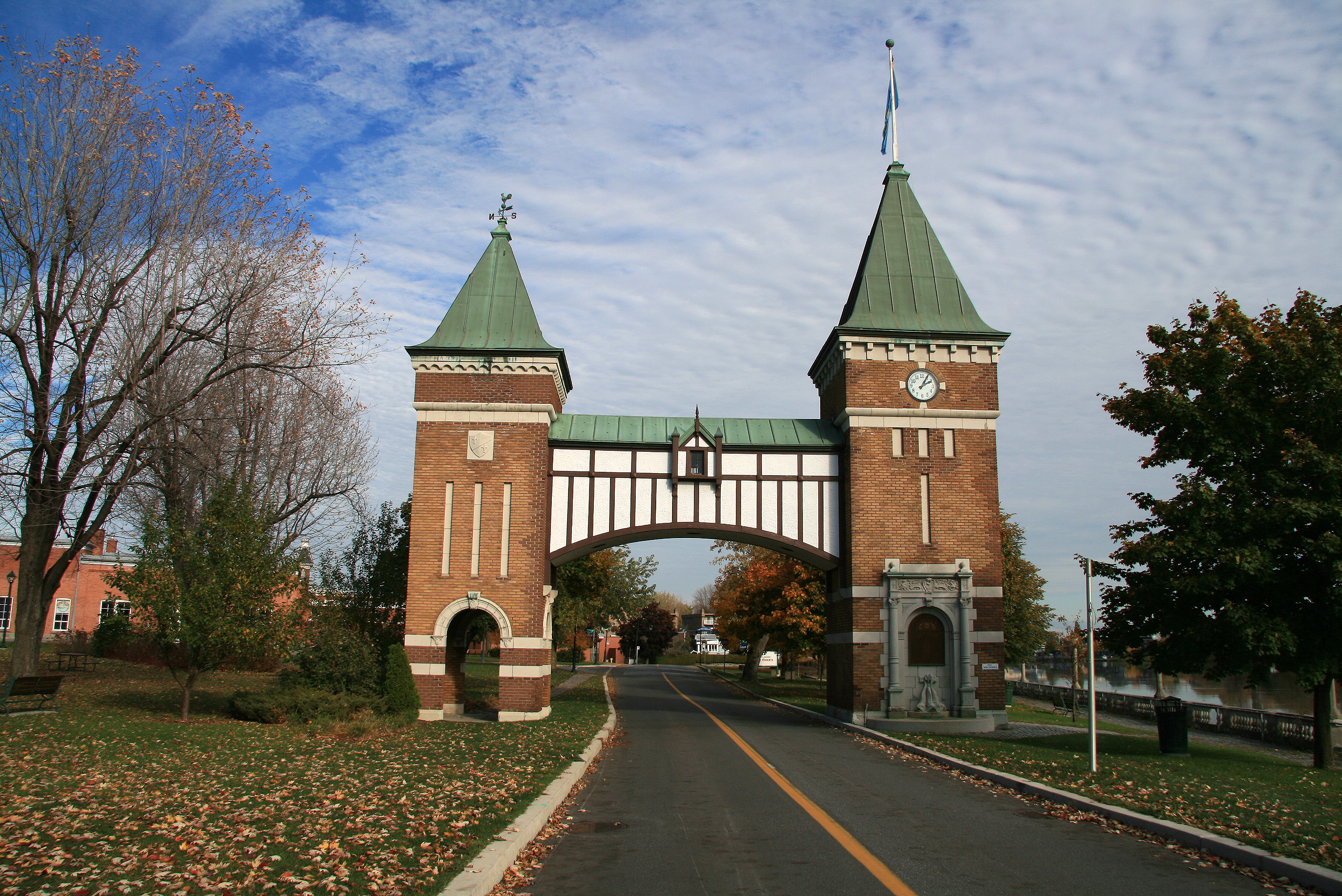
Saint-Hyacinthe, in the Montérégie region, is the hub of the North American markets in the agro-alimentary, veterinary and environmental fields.

Quebec exported C$98 billion in 2021, making it Canada's third highest exporter out of 13 exporters. Fixed wing aircraft, unladen weight (C$5.36B), aluminium unwrought, not alloyed (C$4.64B), aluminium unwrought, alloyed (C$4.24B), iron ore, (C$4.22B), and wood; coniferous species, other than of... (C$2.65B) were Quebec's top exports in 2021.

In 2021, Canada's Quebec imported C$87.5B, making it the 2nd largest importer out of the 13 importers in Canada. In 2021 top imports of Quebec were Petroleum oils, oils from bituminous minerals,... (C$4.57B), Other Aircraft parts (C$2.76B), Parts of turbo-jet or turbo-propeller engines (C$2.28B), Petroleum spirit for motor vehicles (C$2.18B), and Medicaments nes, in dosage (C$1.83B).

In November 2022, Quebec exported mostly to United States (C$6.68B), China (C$309M), France (C$222M), Mexico (C$143M), and Germany (C$136M), and imported mostly from United States (C$3.06B), China (C$1.16B), Italy (C$378M), Germany (C$366M), and Brazil (C$309M).

The North American Free Trade Agreement (NAFTA), grants Quebec, among other things, the access to a market of 130 million consumers within 1,000 kilometres (620 mi). With the World Trade Organization (WTO) and the NAFTA, Quebec is increasing its ability to compete internationally. Following these agreements, trade relations with other countries were boosted. As a result, Quebec has seen its exports increase significantly.

Exports for the year 2022 were 4.5% higher than in 2021

Approximately 85% of Quebec exports are destined for the United States. Economic relations between Quebec and France are important: in 2008, approximately 17,000 Quebecers are employed in 470 French companies in Quebec, and 26,000 French people work in 154 Quebec companies in France.

Several prominent Quebec companies work within the international market: Cascades and AbitibiBowater pulp and paper producers, Agropur milk producer, Bombardier transport manufacturer, CGI information technologies, Cirque du Soleil circus, Couche-Tard convenience stores, Garda security, Énergir power distributor, Cossette marketing firm, Quebecor media and telecommunications, Raymond Chabot Grant Thornton accounting firm, Saputo dairy and food company, Vachon bakery, SNC-Lavalin engineering and construction group, Molson brewery, and many more.

== Largest Quebec companies ==
Here are Quebec's largest companies based on market capitalization as of December 2023:

Rank	Name	Headquarters Location	Sector	Market Capitalization (CAD) (Billions)	Employees	Source
1	Canadian National Railway	Montreal	Transportation & Logistics	$105.79	25,101	
2	Alimentation Couche-Tard	Laval	Convenience Stores	$72.01	128,000	
3	BCE	Verdun	Media & Telecommunications	$46.74	44,610	
4	National Bank of Canada	Montreal	Financials	$33.92	28,916	
5	CGI	Montreal	Information Technology Consulting	$29.26	91,500	
6	Dollarama	Montreal	Variety store	$25.99	8,481	
7	WSP Global	Montreal	Engineering Consulting	$22.60	67,000	
8	Power Corporation of Canada	Montreal	Financials	$22.45	37,300	
9	Metro	Montreal	Supermarket	$15.15	95,000	
10	TFI International	Saint-Laurent	Transportation & Logistics	$13.70	25,998	
11	Saputo	Saint-Leonard	Dairy	$10.96	19,200	
12	iA Financial Group	Québec City	Financials	$9.08	8,900	
13	CAE	Montreal	Aerospace manufacturing	$8.91	13,000	
14	Gildan Activewear	Montreal	Clothing	$7.63	42,000	
15	AtkinsRéalis	Montreal	Engineering Consulting	$7.31	33,876	
16	Quebecor	Montreal	Media & Telecommunications	$7.20	8,832	
17	Air Canada	Montreal	Aviation	$6.55	35,400	
18	Bombardier	Montreal	Aerospace manufacturing	$5.06	15,200	
19	Nuvei	Montreal	Financials	$4.75	1,690	
20	Lightspeed Commerce	Montreal	Financials	$3.86	3,000	

== See also ==
- Quebec
- Quiet Revolution
- Economy of Canada
  - Economy of Ontario
- Canada's Global Markets Action Plan
- Free trade agreements of Canada
