= The Inside Story of China's High-Tech Industry: Making Silicon Valley in Beijing =

2007 book by Yu Zhou

- Cover
- Author: Yu Zhou
- Language: English
- Series: Asia/Pacific/Perspectives
- Subject: Economics, regional sciences, geography, planning, sociology, information technology, Chinese clusters of innovation (COIs), technology and society
- Genre: Non-fiction
- Published: 2007
- Publisher: Rowman & Littlefield
- Pages: 214
- ISBN: 978-0-7425-5579-2

The Inside Story of China's High-Tech Industry: Making Silicon Valley in Beijing is a 2007 book by Chinese-American economic geographer and academic Yu Zhou. Zhou examines the early transformation of Beijing's Zhongguancun (ZGC) Science Park from an academic district with China's leading research institutes and universities to a technologically innovative entrepreneurial center in the information and communication technology (ICT) sectors since the 1980s. The author argues that the synergy of China's domestic and export markets have been crucial to technological learning and industrial competitiveness in China, challenging the notion that export and foreign multinational corporations (MNCs) are the primary drivers of progress in less developed countries. The book was published by Rowman & Littlefield and is part of its Asia/Pacific/Perspectives series.

== Background ==
Zhou is a professor of geography in the Earth Science and Geography Department at Vassar College. She lived in ZGC from the 1970s until her graduation from Perking University in 1989. She received her PhD in geography at University of Minnesota.

== Summary ==
In 8 chapters, Zhou examines the development of the high-tech industry in ZGC, Beijing, between the 1980s and the mid-2000s—a critical transition period of China's technological growth and political changes. She explores the unique growth trajectory of ZGC, contrasting it with other East Asian export-oriented economies by highlighting China's blend of domestic and export market synergies. The book is divided into phases, documenting the birth of nongovernmental technology firms in the 1980s (also known as minying firms), the impact of MNCs in the 1990s, and the rise of returnee Internet entrepreneurs in the 2000s. Zhou introduces a quadrangle innovation system involving domestic companies, MNCs, the state, and research institutes. The author analyses the role of MNCs, the influence of returnee entrepreneurs, and the state's efforts to set technological standards (e.g., its national standard for Wireless LANs WAPI), its third-generation mobile communication standard TD-SCDMA). Zhou interviewed more than a hundred of various enterprises in ZGC. While the book is academic, it is also highly readable by referring to the personal background of the author and many stories of entrepreneurs and other actors the author encountered in ZGC.

== Reviews ==
Peilei Fan praised the book for its comprehensive account of the evolution of ZGC. Fan appreciated Zhou's use of the quadrangle innovation system framework and her vivid, insider perspective. Despite minor criticisms regarding the treatment of theoretical synchronization and the homogeneous view of ICT industries, Fan acknowledged the book's significant contribution to understanding China's technological development. She regarded it as "the best book to date on ZGC".

Douglas Fuller found the book to be a richly illuminating piece of scholarship offering a new perspective on the development of Beijing's ZGC high-technology district. Fuller appreciated Zhou's argument for considering domestic markets, alongside exports, as drivers of technological and economic development in large countries like China. He commended the analysis of the interdependence between local firms and MNCs and the evolution of ZGC, while also noting areas where the book could have included more robust arguments and data.

In his review, Mark Greeven judged the book as the most comprehensive and readable account of the ZGC high-technology area in Beijing. Greeven praised Zhou's extensive fieldwork and historical insights, noting that the book convincingly argues for the emergence of China's technological leadership from indigenous enterprises rather than MNCs or the government. Greeven still critiqued Zhou for downplaying the role of the government and not fully exploring regional diversity within China's innovation system.

Yun-Chung Chen praised the work for providing a comprehensive and insider perspective on the development of ZGC, Beijing's high-tech district. Chen appreciated the book's focus on the ICT industry and its theoretical insights, which distinguish it from other journalistic accounts. He noted the detailed analysis of different phases of ZGC's development and the roles of various actors, such as minying companies, MNCs, and overseas-trained returnee entrepreneurs. Chen also highlighted Zhou's critical views on technological nationalism and her argument about the significant yet complex impact of MNCs on China's technological advancement.

In his review, Fulong Wu highlighted Zhou's first-hand account and extensive fieldwork, documenting the transformation of ZGC into a high-tech hub. He found Zhou's analysis of the interaction between state policies, local firms, and MNCs compelling, noting the book's contribution to understanding China's indigenous R&D development. Wu concluded that the book is a significant and timely contribution to studies on China's technological advancement and urban development.
