= Lac à Paul mine =

Phosphate mine in Quebec, Canada

Coordinates: 49°53′20″N 70°43′50″W

- Interactive map of Lac à Paul mine
- Location: Quebec, Canada
- Products: Phosphates
- Company: Arianne Phosphate Inc.
- Website: https://www.arianne-inc.com

The Lac à Paul mine is a phosphate reserve. It is one of the largest in Canada, having estimated reserves of 590 million tonnes of ore grading 7.13% P_{2}O_{5}. The project is developed by Arianne Phosphate, a mining company located in Quebec. Arianne Phosphate Inc. is listed on the TSX Venture Exchange under the symbol "DAN".

== Location ==
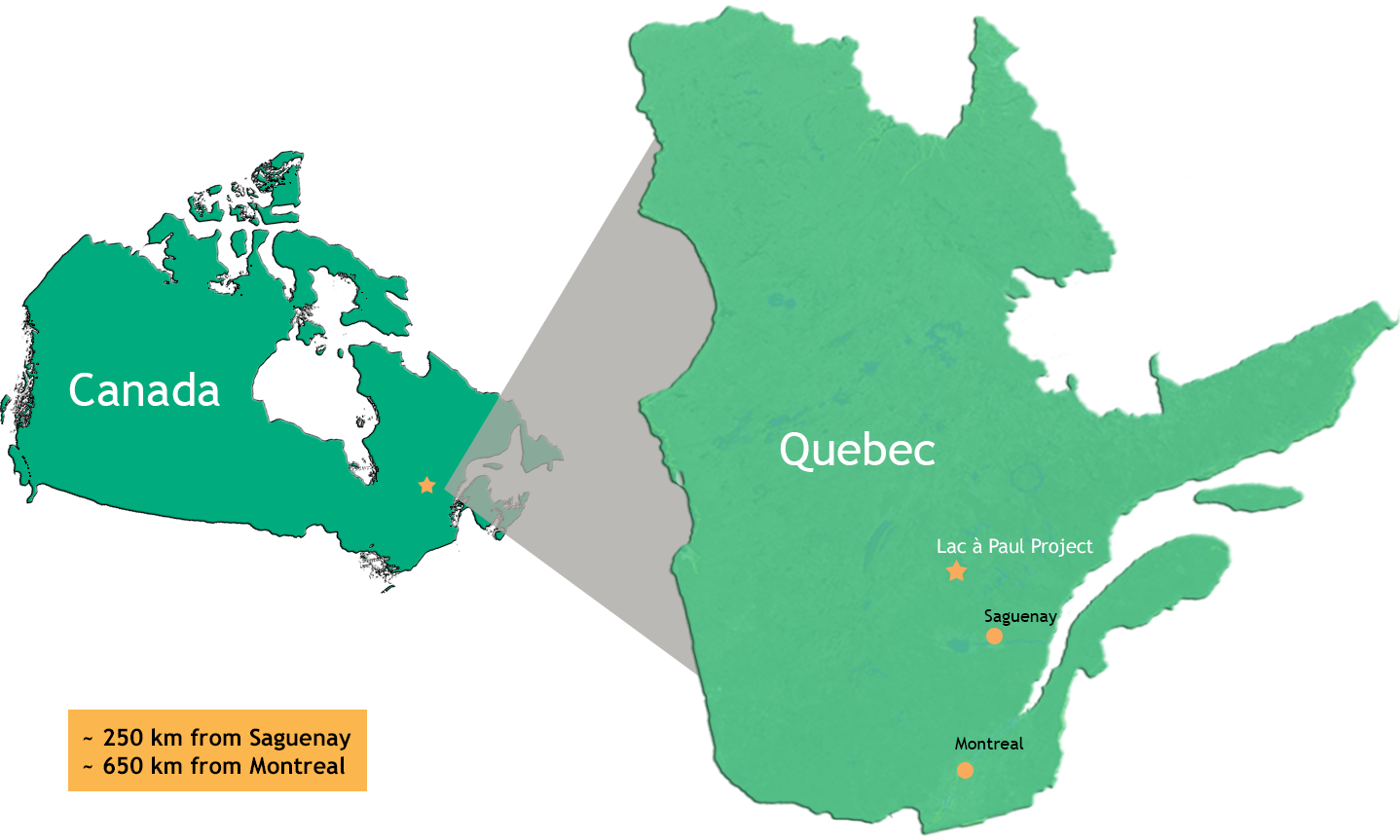

The Lac à Paul project is located north of the 49th parallel (an area covered by the Plan Nord), north of Saguenay-Lac-Saint-Jean region.
