= BC Agriculture in the Classroom Foundation =

Nonprofit organization

BC Agriculture in the Classroom Foundation (BCAITC) is a registered nonprofit organization that works with educators through various programs to bring British Columbia's agriculture to elementary and secondary students within the province. Students learn about where their food comes from, how to grow their own food, and why farms and agriculture play such an important role in our society.

== Governance ==
The foundation is part of a national group, Agriculture in the Classroom that operates across Canada through individual provinces. Though partially supported by government, the foundation relies on financial support from the agricultural community to sustain its activities.

The organization's mission is: "Working to bring BC's agriculture to our students".

The foundation has representation on its board of directors from teachers, the provincial government, financial institutions, nutritionists, producers, and dieticians.

== Teacher Resources and Programs ==
BCAITC's resource centre provides teachers with print and video resources. With titles such as The Sustainability Road Show, Wonderful Worms, Food For Thought, and Spuds In Tubs, teachers from all grades are encouraged to bring resources into their classroom and have developed different programs to help spread awareness of agriculture and the importance of eating healthy and supporting local producers.

=== Take a Bite of BC ===
Take a Bite of BC was developed in 2009 by BCAITC in partnership with the BC Culinary Arts Association, BC agricultural commodity groups and BC producers. BC grown products are donated to the program and delivered to participating secondary school teaching kitchens over a four-month period. The program provides an opportunity for Chef Instructors to feature locally grown product in secondary school teaching kitchens. Students gain experience working with fresh products and begin to develop an appreciation for farmers in their community as they connect with the foods that are grown around them and learn about the benefits of eating healthy, fresh and local. As of the 2016/2017 school year, all 60 secondary schools with culinary arts programs are benefiting from this program.

=== Spuds in Tubs ===
BCAITC's signature program, Spuds in Tubs enables students to experience growing their own food. With the help of a teacher, students plant seed potatoes into tubs, and from there tend them and watch them grow into something they can harvest and eat. There are currently 125 classrooms and 3,250 students participating.

=== The BC School Fruit and Vegetable Nutritional Program ===
The foundation's biggest program, the BC School Fruit and Vegetable Nutritional Program, partners with local producers to deliver fresh, local fruits and vegetables to BC schools. In 2011 a three million dollar expansion of the program was announced and the program will now reach over 1,200 schools in BC, and serve over 400,000 students with fresh fruits and vegetables.

== Summer Institute ==
The Summer Institute is a course put on by BCAITC for teachers who want to learn more about agriculture. This course is designed for teachers in the BC school system to explore practical ways to integrate concepts related to food production and consumption, food safety, agricultural issues, and sustainability across the curriculum at all grade levels. Through active participation, field trips, guest speakers, video presentations, and the like, participants will expand their knowledge of agriculture and food concepts and issues and reflect on their own values and orientations to the topic. Ways to incorporate this new knowledge into existing courses will be explored with ethical defensibility being the guiding principle. The goal is to produce curriculum projects that can be implemented in schools or other settings. The course is put on in partnership with the University of British Columbia.

== See also ==
- Agriculture in Canada
