= Northwest Atlantic Fisheries Centre =

Canadian Government research facility

Coordinates: 47.587717°N 52.679083°W

The Northwest Atlantic Fisheries Centre is a Government of Canada research facility and office complex located in St. John's, Newfoundland and Labrador.

It is primarily used by the Department of Fisheries and Oceans.
