= Breaker eggs =

Eggs removed from the shell and sold as a liquid

Breaker eggs (also called liquid eggs) are chicken eggs that have been broken out of their shells to be sold in liquid form and are utilized in the food industry as an ingredient in other food products, as opposed to being sold fresh in their shells in protective cartons. In the United States, Iowa is a leading producer of this product. A 2015 avian bird flu outbreak in the American Midwest struck the breaker egg-laying hens and forced breaker egg prices higher. By the end of 2015, prices were again on the down-swing. Another avian influenza that forced the destruction of tens of millions of chickens in 2022 again led to skyrocketing prices for breaker eggs.

An early 2025 outbreak of avian influenza drove egg prices higher once again, but in this instance, the increase in liquid egg prices was not as severe as for shell eggs.

== See also ==
- Scrambled eggs
