= Plan Nord =

Quebec economic development strategy

Plan Nord (meaning 'Plan North' in English) is an economic development strategy launched by the government of Quebec in May 2011 to develop the natural resources extraction sector in the part of Quebec to the north of the 49th parallel. The plan, to be carried out over 25 years, would foster over C$80 billion in energy, mining, and forestry investments and create or consolidate 20,000 jobs a year for the duration. The proposed plan, which has been described as "a potential centrepiece" of Premier Jean Charest's political legacy, has received the full support of the mining industry, the Crees and Inuit representatives but has been met with scepticism and downright opposition by the Innus and most environmentalists.

== Territory ==
The territory covered by Plan Nord includes all of Quebec north of the 49th parallel and the Gulf of Saint Lawrence. The 1,200,000 km^{2} (463,000 sq mi) area includes the Nord-du-Québec region as well as the northern part of Saguenay–Lac-Saint-Jean and most of Côte-Nord. A large part of the territory is governed by the James Bay and Northern Quebec Agreement and the Northeastern Quebec Agreement signed in the 1970s in the context of the James Bay Project.

The Plan Nord territory is 320,000 km^{2} (120,000 sq mi) of boreal forest, drawing protests from Innu First Nations members.

While protecting some part of the territory, 60,000 km^{2} (23,000 sq mi), the agreement has a clause that allows the protected areas to become available for mining and gas exploitation if such resources are found.

== See also ==
- Jean Charest
- Nitassinan
- Northern Ontario Ring of Fire

== Works cited ==
- Government of Quebec (2011). Building Northern Québec Together : The Project of a Generation (PDF). ISBN 978-2-550-61430-2. Archived from the original (PDF) on March 30, 2012.
