= Clusters of Innovation =

Clusters of Innovations (COI) have been defined in 2015 as "global economic hot spots where new technologies germinate at an astounding rate and where pools of capital, expertise, and talent foster the development of new industries and new ways of doing business."

== Concept ==
The definition of a clusters of innovation (COI) is an evolution of the original concept of Business cluster which Michael Porter had proposed in 1990 as a "Geographically proximate group of interconnected companies and associated institutions in a particular field"

The most noticeable difference is the term innovation, which did not appear in the 1990 concept, although implied, because companies and other entities within the ecosystem and their relationships stimulate the development of new technologies and accelerate learning. Porter's emphasis was on competitive advantage achieved through easier access to skills, suppliers, customers, specialized information, and complementary products and services which leads to lower costs and higher quality. In Porter's definition "industrial homogeneity" was a crucial aspect to distinguish amongst clusters, e.g. leather fashion, wine, microelectronics.

COI combines the previous concept of business cluster, enriched with new findings and analytical tools to better understand the level of dynamism of some clusters, above all Silicon Valley, the continued emergence of start ups, the continued generation of ideas and solutions and the "blooming" of more industrial fields within the cluster.

Clusters of innovation can also cause leapfrogging to occur.

== Features ==
The COI is a "special ecosystem" hinges on the interrelation between a number factors:

=== Synergy with educational and research institutions ===
Educational and research institutions, in particular universities can foster innovation as knowledge creation and diffusion centers, providing companies with valuable background expertise and skilled workers, and being a source of entrepreneurial activities and entrepreneurs that these activities generate.

Universities reinforce an entrepreneurial culture by fostering creativity, experimentation, risk and acceptance of business failure. At Silicon Valley both local universities, Stanford and Berkeley, played a key role. Stanford University's dean, Frederick Emmons Terman was very active in fostering entrepreneurial initiatives, by offering support, collaboration and networking, but also in undertaking directly commercial activities. Stanford university's decision in 1951 to open the Stanford Research Park on its land was a milestone in the development of Silicon Valley and gave numerous firms the opportunity to settle in a stimulating and prosperous environment. Berkley was more devoted to produce high quality research and education, which resulted in the creation of a new generation of entrepreneurs like the founders of Intel.

=== Support from public institutions ===
Although the artificious creation of business agglomerations has often proven unsuccessful, public institutions, beside nationwide programs and policies, have significantly contributed to the development of localized clusters through various measures such as resources provision, investments and commissioning.

Research shows that support from government and public institutions can take more shapes. In some cases, public institutions' impact on clusters has been indirect. For example, the investments of the US Defence department in Silicon Valley helped the initial development of the incipient electronic industry. In other cases, public institutions have been more active either by fostering the growth of existing clusters, through infrastructure development, universities funding and provision of grants and loans, or by transforming and equipping a geographical area to host a new cluster as for example in Barcelona where the creation of the business district 22@ was the result of an extensive urban renewal of the neighbourhood Poblenou.

=== Access to financing ===
Many examples show that the traditional bank oriented finance system is a severe hindrance to innovative entrepreneurship as it tends to be very risk averse. Innovation clusters need players who help translate creativity into commercial innovation which means on the one hand placing the emphasis on opportunities rather than on safe investment and on the other hand providing companies with business support. This model, which describes how venture capital firms operate, is vital to nurture the multitude of entrepreneurial activities of a business cluster.

=== The presence of multinational companies ===
Despite their image of powerful entities overshadowing smaller payers, multinational companies often have provided valuable contribution to business clusters through R&D, training and development for local workers and spin off companies. This contribution has recently received a further boost with the emergence of the open innovation model which promotes ideas and knowledge sharing as a means to generate improvement and win-win outcomes.

=== Interpersonal networks ===
The close proximity of the various players of an innovation cluster fosters a flow of interactions which facilitates all activities connected with entrepreneurship such as recruitment, supply, financing and business development. Amongst several factors, an element which has been the focus of attention of many researchers, as closely associated with innovation, is knowledge sharing. An interesting analysis of this concept proposes the distinction between "Component knowledge" and "Architectural knowledge".

Component knowledge refers to identifiable parts of the organization and can be broken down into distinctive areas, such as engineering, design, scientific, etc. This knowledge is relatively easy to transfer.

Architectural knowledge is the unique knowledge that the organization develops to coordinate the overall system and integrate its component knowledge. Since this knowledge is tightly tied with the organization history and identity, it tends to remain private. However, through interactions and informal contacts the firms within a cluster develop a "cluster level architectural knowledge" which oversees all their interdependencies. This knowledge facilitates the transfer, absorption and utilization of component knowledge among the companies of the cluster and at the same time makes it more difficult for external companies to access it and as such accelerates innovation within the cluster and provides it with an advantage towards external competitors.

=== Shared values and alignment of interests ===
An agglomeration of firms becomes an ecosystem when a set of recognized formal and informal rules and norms is in place. The former are subordinate to the latter as they tend to mirror values and codes of conduct which informally govern the interactions amongst the actors of the system. Crucial for the establishment and prosperity of entrepreneurial activities is a culture that promotes venture, risk and accepts business failure. An innovation cluster requires an even stronger propensity towards these values as they are instrumental for "the germination of new technologies at an astounding rate". Likewise this high degree of dynamism is achieved in an atmosphere of trust, informal interactions and collaboration accompanied by alignment of interests at all levels. At firm's level hierarchical layers become blurred as well as the boundaries between ownership and workforce. Contribution from all parties is encouraged as a means to generate innovation and compensation mechanisms are designed for this purpose. The traditional wage and benefits system is replaced by new reward measures which include equity participation. Stock options plans facilitate and reinforce the perception of a common path between founders, managers and employees. At inter-firm level the sophistication of the pursued objectives together with a global vision favour not only partnerships between suppliers and customers and complementary transactions but also horizontal cooperation between competitors who benefit from each other's contribution to lay the foundations for new horizons. Finally, firms and investors are also aligned. Venture capitalists share the destiny of their clients for part of their journey and provide them with their business expertise while, at the same time, adding further motivational grip through staged funding supply and other financial measures.

=== Mobility of people ===
Innovation requires a constant movement of people who transfer their skills, experiences and knowledge across entities stepping from a setting to another, for example from education to employment, from employment to entrepreneurship, from entrepreneurship to venture capital etc. However, to attain the amount of energy, creativity and mix of talents necessary to empower the cluster with innovative drive, internal mobility must be accompanied by an inflow of external resources from other geographical areas within and outside the country.

=== Being global ===
The employment of foreign workers within the cluster shows its openness but it does not explain another element incorporated in the definition of COI: being global. This means looking at the entire globe as a market from the very beginning despite taking advantage of local conditions. But it also means international exchange of resources and synergies through Networks of COI (NCOI) defined as "connections between individuals, firms, universities, research centers, and other organizations in geographically dispersed COI". Three types of international linkages have been identified:

- Weak ties: interactions between people with common interests or cultural background.
- Durable bonds: stable business connections between individuals in different COI.
- Covalent bonds: individuals who act simultaneously in two or more clusters and as such reinforce the pursuit of common objectives.

==== Super-COI ====
Through covalent bonds and long-distance relationships two or more clusters can engage in such a close collaboration that they could be assimilated to a single cluster or to a "Super Cluster of Innovation (Super-COI)". Two examples are the Silicon Valley-Taiwan and Silicon Valley-Israel Super Clusters. The first is the result of social and professional connections that Taiwanese people returning home from Silicon Valley brought with them and consequent specialisation of the Taiwanese cluster as product manufacturer for Silicon Valley firms. The second stems from the traditional ties between US and Israel's large pool of engineering and scientific resources with subsequent specialisation of Israel as R&D centre hosting and providing support to Silicon Valley's companies.

== Implications ==
The above factors have been observed as important ingredients for an innovation cluster. This could suggest that the replication of these conditions would be sufficient to create a successful cluster. In reality there is no one size- fits all solution. There are considerable economic, political, cultural and institutional differences between geographic areas which strongly influence the shape and development of clusters.

A clear and strong commitment towards entrepreneurship and innovation is not sufficient without fertile ground in respect of infrastructure, education, social values, legal system etc. However even where all the basic conditions seem to exist there could be specific aspects which block the process of spontaneous formation of innovation clusters. For example, in Germany till 1990s government attention was mainly directed towards the traditional sector. This together with a bank oriented financial system and a culture of low inclination towards risk prevented the creation of an in-house Silicon Valley model. Since then a great deal of measures to overcome these obstacles have been adopted although the distance with Silicon Valley remains considerable.

There are more recipes to build a successful innovation cluster and the factors described above play to some extent and at some point an important role although their dosage varies. The input from external actors, in particular public institutions, can be pivotal as a means of cluster generation and development but cannot overturn the rule that innovation is a bottom up process.

== See also ==
- Innovation system
- Innovation district
