= Royal Canadian Regiment Museum =

Museum in London, Ontario, Canada

Coordinates: 43.0002°N 81.2339°W

The Royal Canadian Regiment Museum
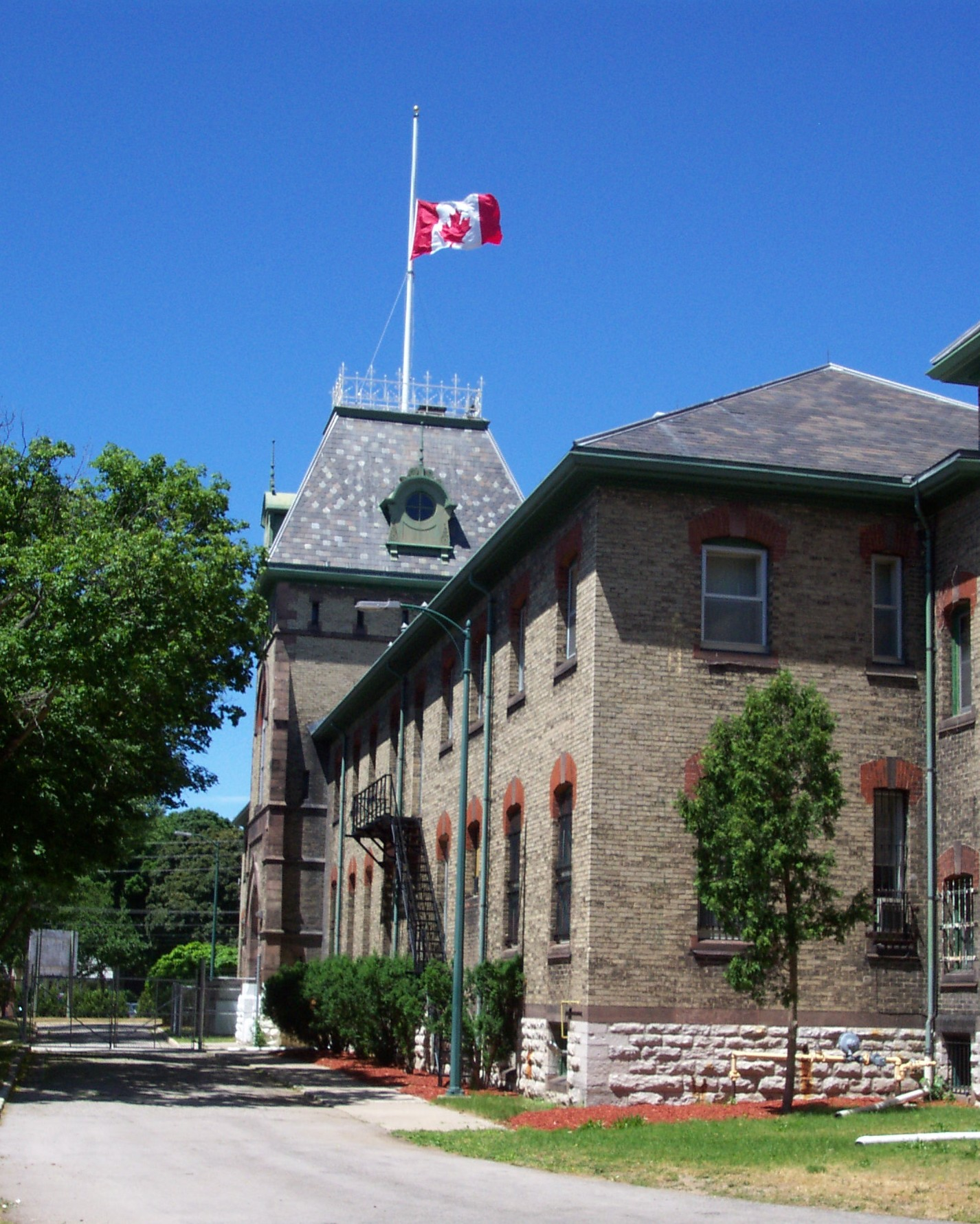
- Established: 1983
- Location: Wolseley Barracks, 701 Oxford Street East Street, in London, Ontario, Canada
- Type: Military

The Royal Canadian Regiment Museum is located at Wolseley Barracks (the former CFB London) in London, Ontario, Canada.

== History ==
Although original architectural drawings of Wolseley Hall drafted in 1886 show space allocated to a museum, the museum in its current form was officially opened in 1983 during the royal visit of H.R.H. Prince Philip, Duke of Edinburgh. It is dedicated to the exploits of The Royal Canadian Regiment. Artifacts displayed in the museum cover the regiment's activities from the Yukon Gold Rush to their recent work in Afghanistan.

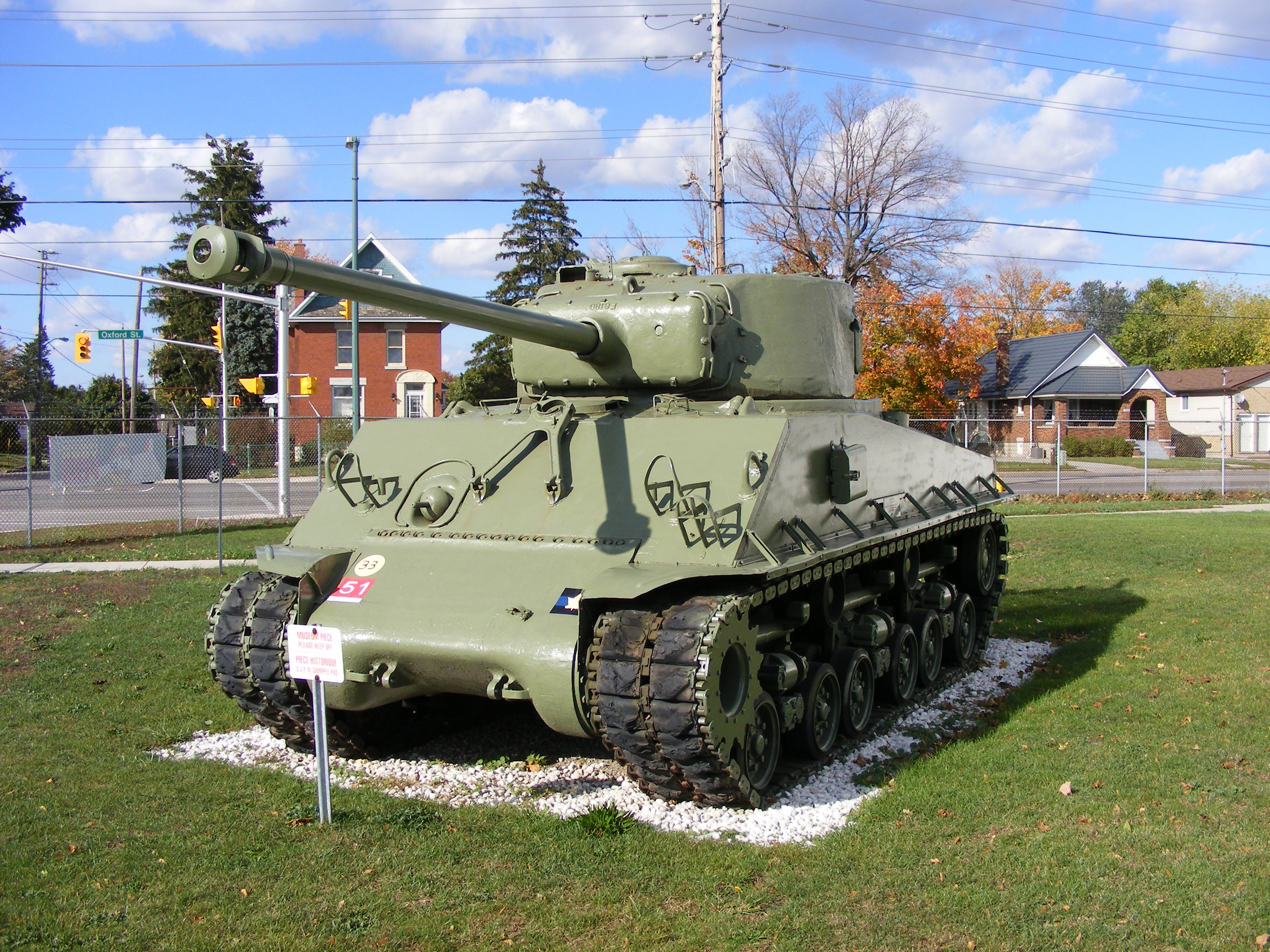
Sherman M4A2E8 (76 mm) HVSS tank displayed near the Royal Canadian Regiment Military Museum

The museum preserves regimental history and serves as a training medium to teach regimental history through the collection of documents, pictures, books, military artifacts, etc. It provides research facilities for the study of Canadian military history dating from 1833 in so far as it affects The Royal Canadian Regiment. The museum displays and illustrates in an appropriate manner the dress, weapons, and customs of the regiment’s military heritage including the history of The London and Oxford Fusiliers (The Canadian Fusiliers (City of London Regiment), and The Oxford Rifles – of Woodstock, Ontario). The museum serves as a place of military interest for the public and Canadian Forces personnel.

== Collection ==
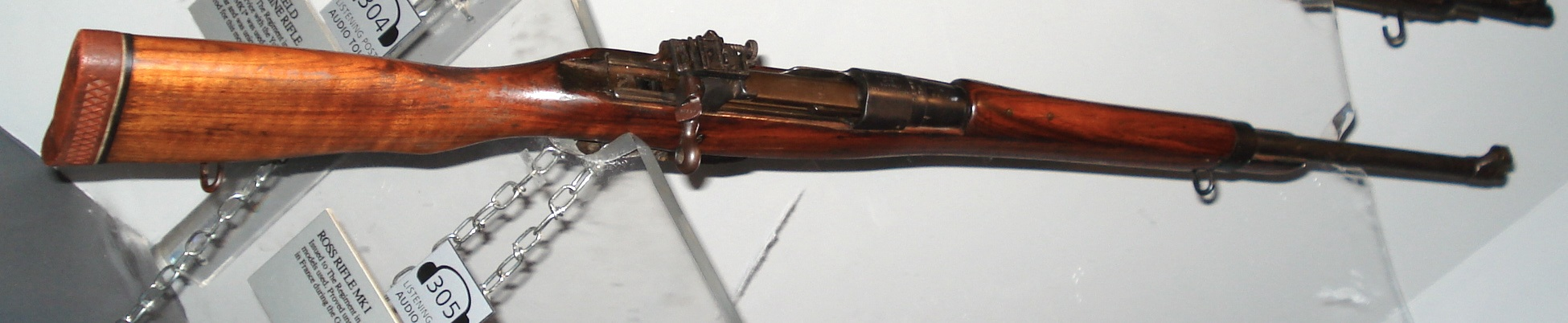
Canadian Ross Rifle, displayed at the museum

Collecting regimental artifacts is an activity that goes back to the beginnings of the RCR. To fulfill its mandate, the museum continues to pro-actively collect historically significant objects and archives that are connected to the RCR's history. A large variety of artifacts forms its collection today: regimental memorials, silverware, uniforms, medals, original art, weapons, military equipment, archives, musical instruments, etc.

Among the significant items on display is a scarf which is an exact replica of one hand knit by Queen Victoria during the Second Boer War (one of eight that she made). The original scarf presented to Private Richard Thompson of the RCR is on display in the Canadian War Museum. Four such scarves were presented to soldiers of the British Army, and four to soldiers of colonial forces (Canada, Australia, New Zealand and South Africa).

Other items of interest are a wooden cross from Flanders Fields, a recreation of a World War I trench and a street scene from the Italian Campaign. Outside the museum is a display of artillery and military vehicles, including a Universal Carrier, a 25 pounder and a Lynx reconnaissance vehicle.

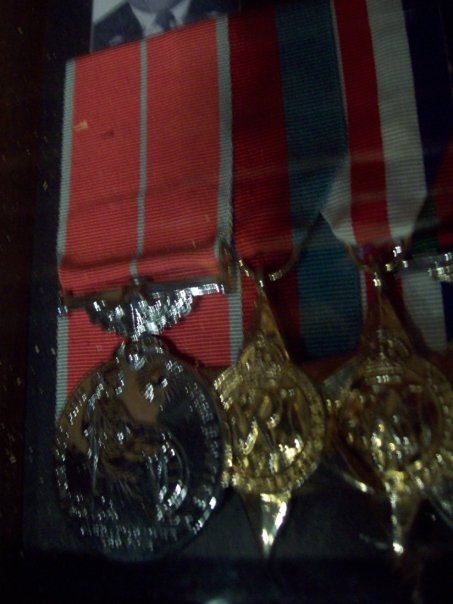
British Empire Medal, mounted with other medals, on display at the Royal Canadian Regiment Museum

The museum also holds the medals of Brigadier Milton F. Gregg, VC and of General Charles Foulkes, the man who accepted Nazi German Generaloberst Johannes Blaskowitz' capitulation agreement at the Hotel de Wereld in Wageningen (Netherlands) on 5 May 1945, effectively ending World War II in Europe.

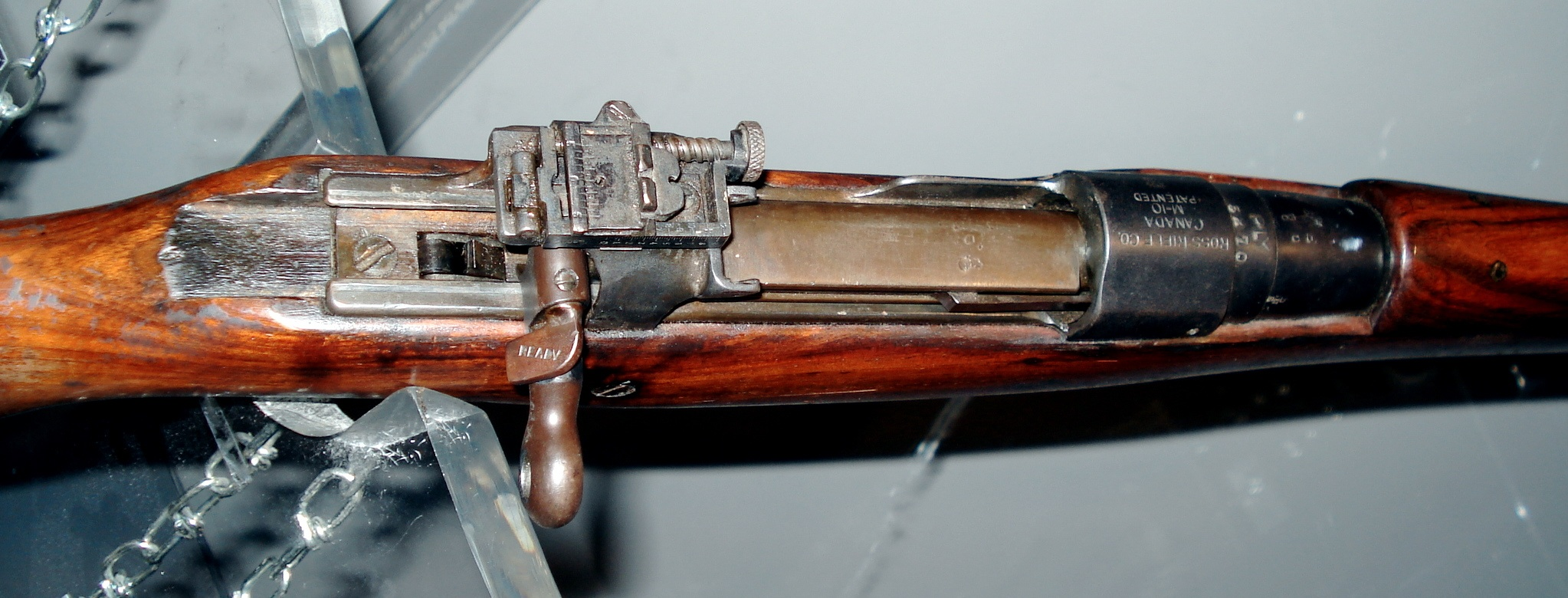
Canadian Ross Rifle, Mk.1, at RCR Museum in London,

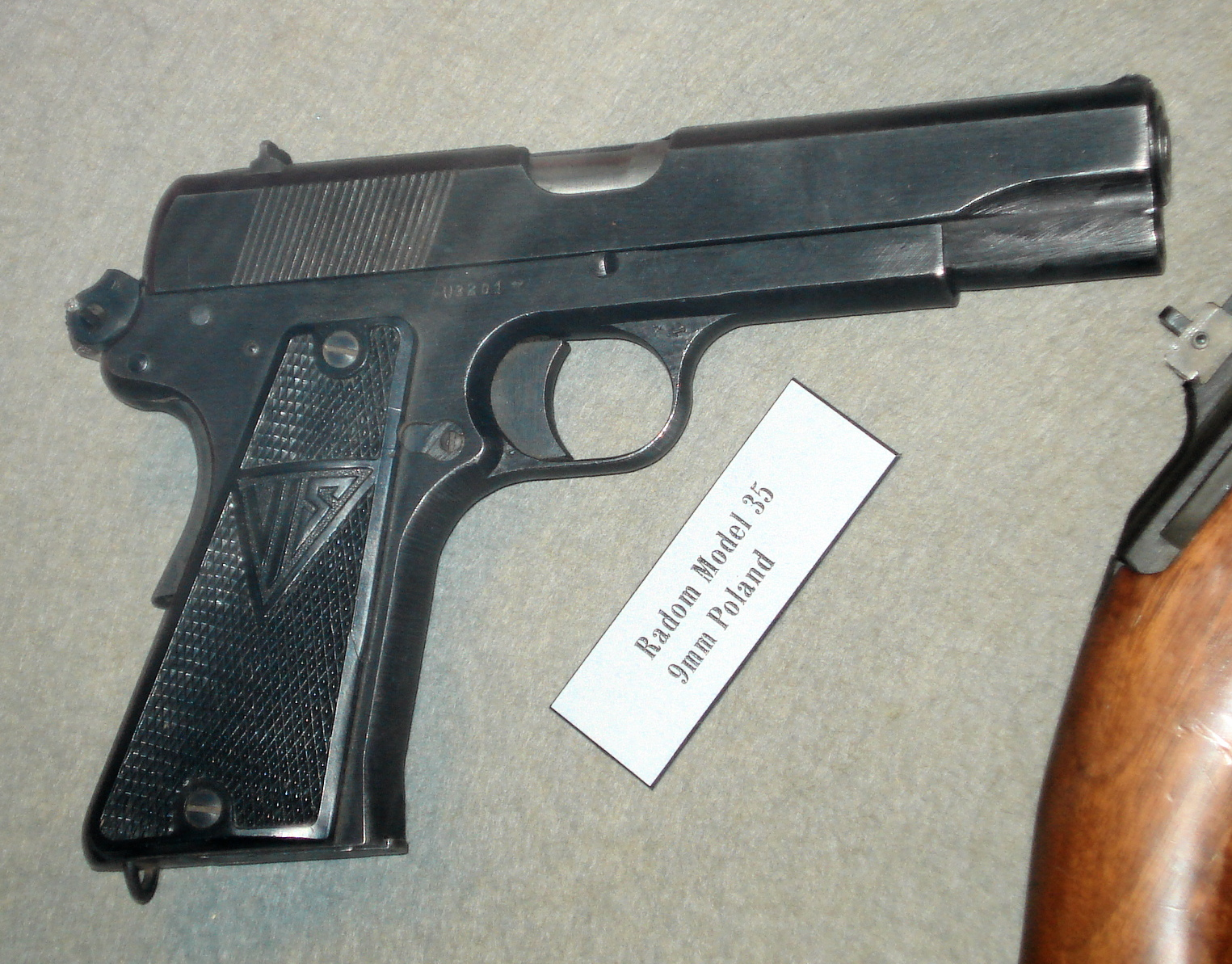
35 pistol at RCR Museum in London,

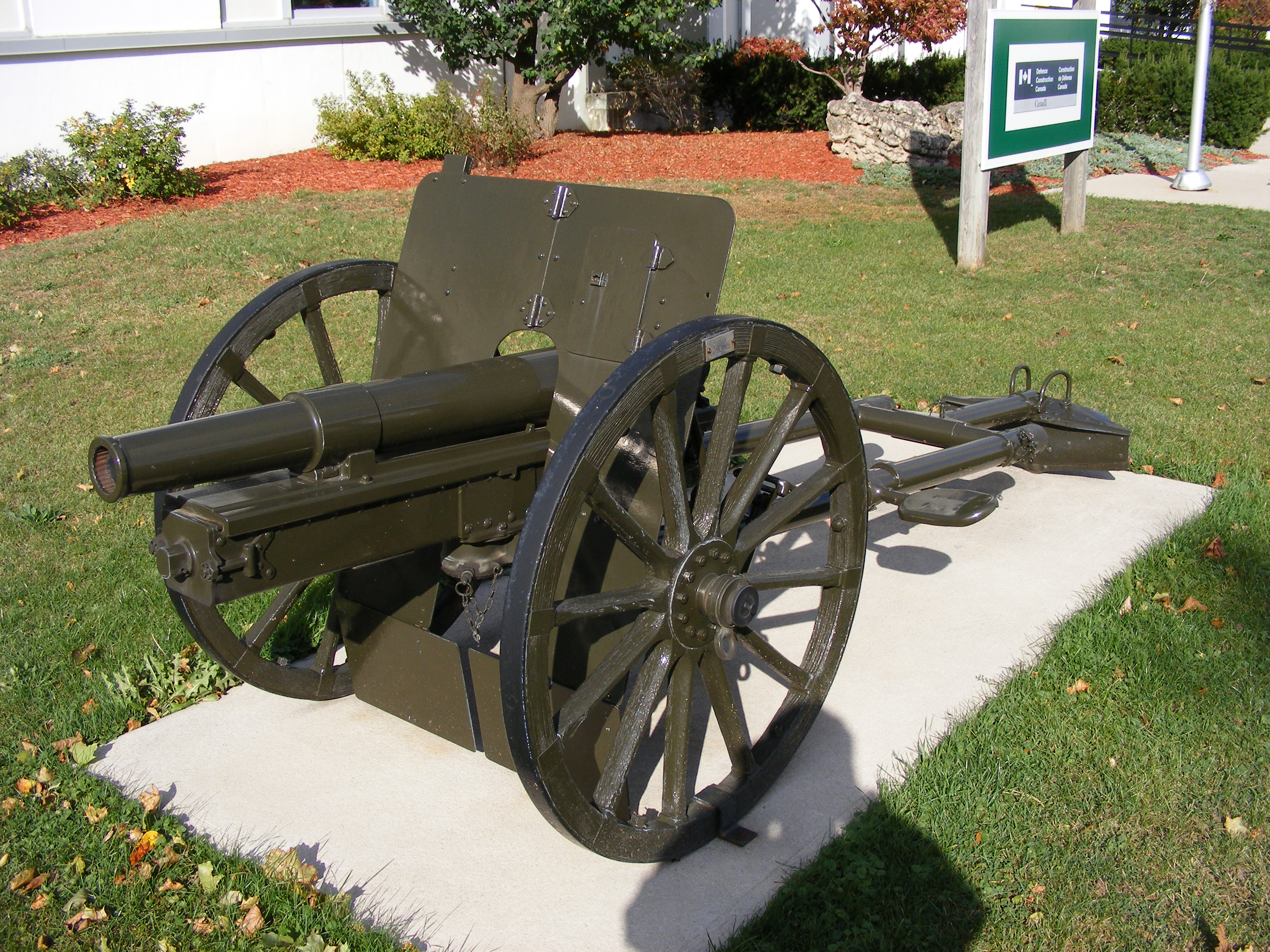
Japanese Type 41 75 mm Mountain Gun, at RCR Museum in London,

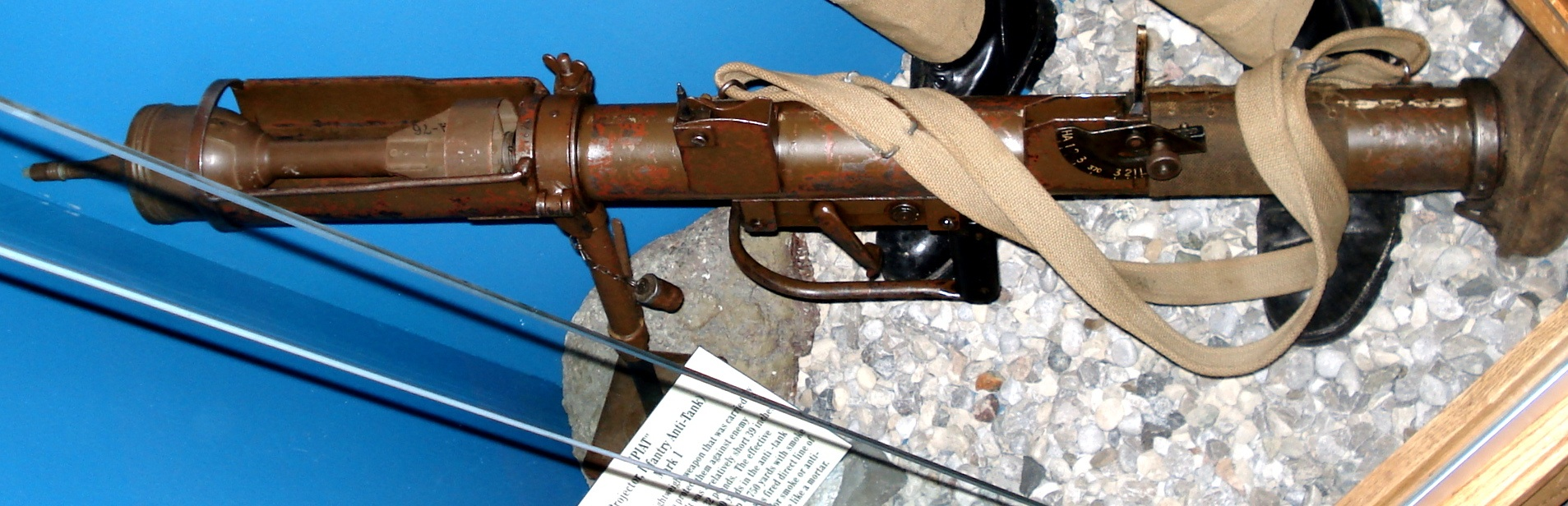
British anti-tank weapon PIAT, at RCR Museum in London,

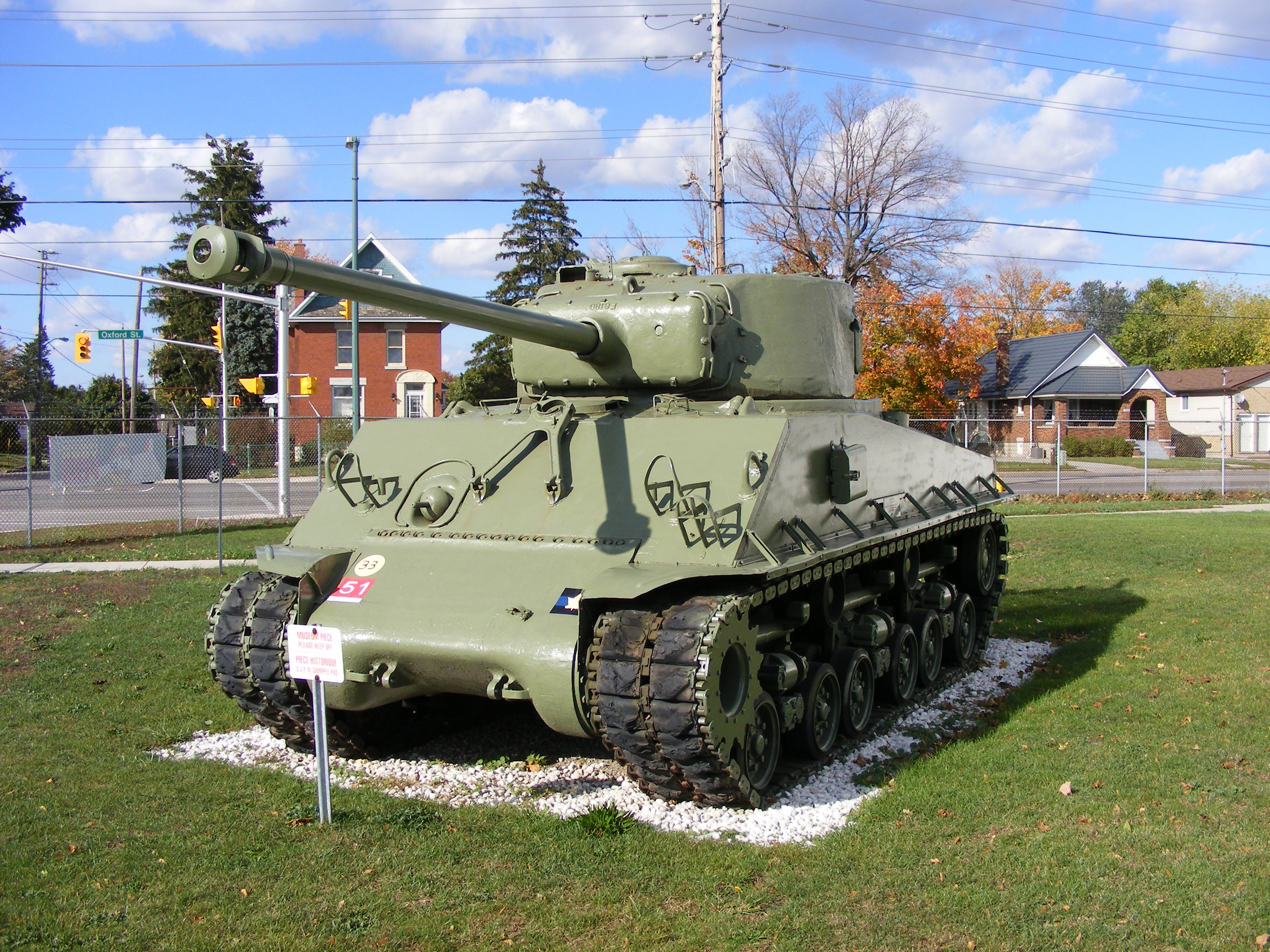
Sherman M4A2E8 (76 mm) HVSS tank at RCR Museum in London,

== See also ==
- Base Borden Military Museum,
- Elgin Military Museum,
- Maritime Museum of the Atlantic
- National Air Force Museum of Canada
- The Military Museums,
- The Queen's Own Cameron Highlanders of Canada Museum
- Virtual Museum of Canada
- Organization of Military Museums of Canada
- Military history of Canada

== Affiliations ==
The museum is affiliated with: CMA, OMA, CHIN, OMMC, HPMMN.
