= Queen's Own Cameron Highlanders of Canada Museum =

Coordinates: 49.8908°N 97.1788°W

The Queen's Own Cameron Highlanders of Canada Museum
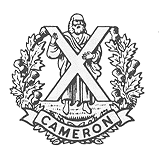
- Location: Winnipeg, Manitoba, Canada
- Type: Military museum

The Queens Own Cameron Highlanders Museum is a military museum in Winnipeg, Manitoba. The museum at the Minto Armoury is dedicated to Manitoba's famous Scottish regiment, The Queen's Own Cameron Highlanders of Canada, which was first raised in 1910.

== History ==
The Queen's Own Cameron Highlanders of Canada served with distinction in World War I, providing 5 battalions in the Canadian Expeditionary Force (the 16th, 27th, 43rd, 174th and 179th). The Regiment also participated in the 1942 Dieppe Raid and throughout northwest Europe in World War II.

== Collections ==
The museum displays artifacts and photographs of The Queen's Own Cameron Highlanders of Canada Regiment.

== Gallery ==
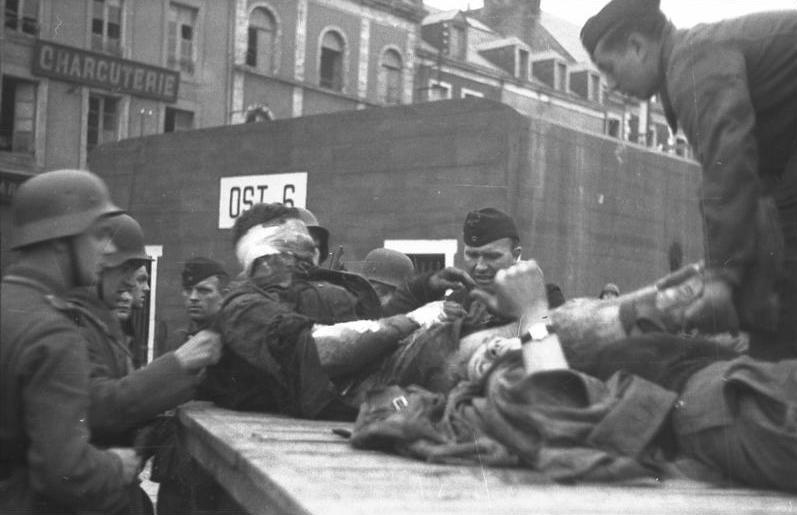
Tom McCormack, Queen's Own Cameron Highlanders

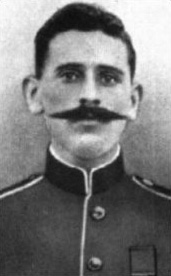
Ross Tollerton, World War I Victoria Cross recipient, Queen's Own Cameron Highlanders

== Affiliations ==
The Museum is affiliated with the CMA, CHIN, OMMC, and Virtual Museum of Canada.

== See also ==
- Canadian Warplane Heritage Museum
- Cold Lake Air Force Museum
- Commonwealth Air Training Plan Museum
- Comox Air Force Museum
- Great War Flying Museum
- Military history of Canada
- National Air Force Museum of Canada
- Organization of Military Museums of Canada
- Secrets of Radar Museum
- The Queen's Own Cameron Highlanders of Canada
