= Secrets of Radar Museum =

Museum in London, Ontario, Canada

Coordinates: 42.9519°N 81.2214°W

- Established: 2003
- Location: 2155b Crumlin Side Road, London, Ontario, Canada.
- Type: military museum; science & technology; history
- Collections: technology, RCAF, military, archives, research library
- Curator: Maya Hirschman
- Website: https://www.secretsofradar.com/

The Secrets of Radar Museum is a small museum located at 2155b Crumlin Sideroad near the London International Airport in London, Ontario, Canada. Opened to the public in 2003, the museum was created to tell the story of the more than 6,000 Canadian World War II veterans who were recruited into a top-secret project during World War II involving radar. Drawn from every walk of life, and sent around the world, these veterans were held to an Oath of Secrecy that was not fully lifted until 1991.

The museum is an incorporated not-for-profit museum located in London, Ontario.

== Mandate ==
The Museum's mandate is threefold:

1. To preserve the history and artifacts of the men and women who have served the RADAR division of the Canadian Military
2. To educate the public on the history of RADAR in Canada
3. To provide a therapeutic setting for veterans

== About the Museum ==
During World War II, at the request of the British government, over 6,000 Canadians were trained on RADAR and sent to every theatre of war. Subject to the Official Secrets Act, which expired after 50 years, it was only in 1991 that these men and women were able to share their experiences. Canadian radar personnel were a crucial part of the war effort and the Secrets of Radar Museum preserves and shares their history. Many of these early radar veterans went on to have leadership roles in the development of radar during the Cold War and in the Canadian electronics industry.

== Collection ==
The Museum's collection includes several thousand photographs, as well as original radar equipment. While most World War II-era radar equipment has long since been destroyed, the Museum has examples of GEE, Fishpond, H2X, IFF (Identify Friend or Foe) radars, along with magnetrons, vacuum tubes (known as valves in England) and several hundred personal artifacts of various types. The Museum is also home to a substantial library and archive available to researchers, and numerous oral history interviews with radar veterans.

== Programs ==
The museum offers curriculum-linked school programs related to history, geography, and science & technology for students in Grades 5 to 12.

== Events ==
The museum is an annual participating site in Doors Open London and in 2012 was listed as one of the city's Top Ten sites.

== Plans ==
Since moving to its new location in the summer of 2017, it has opened its exhibit on Cold War radar history, including DEW Line (Distant Early Warning) and Pinetree Line radar history. The museum is also planning to develop a travelling exhibition about Cold War radar and the experiences of the people working in the field. In 2017, the museum received funding from the Virtual Museum of Canada to develop a web-based exhibit about London, Ontario's radar history. The project is underway with completion set for the first half of 2018.

== Affiliations ==
The Museum is affiliated with: CMA, OMMC, CHIN, and Virtual Museum of Canada.

== See also ==
- Organization of Military Museums of Canada
- Canadian Warplane Heritage Museum
- Military history of Canada
- Commonwealth Air Training Plan Museum
- Cold Lake Air Force Museum
- Comox Air Force Museum
- National Air Force Museum of Canada
