= Elgin Military Museum =

Coordinates: 42.778866°N 81.209468°W

- Location: St. Thomas, Ontario
- Type: Military and War museum
- Website: http://www.theelginmilitarymuseum.ca/

The Elgin Military Museum is a privately owned, not-for-profit local museum in St. Thomas, Ontario, Canada. Founded in 1982 to preserve and commemorate the contributions of Elgin County to broader Canadian military history, the museum includes exhibits on the War of 1812, the First World War, the Cold War and the War in Afghanistan.

== History ==
The Elgin Military Museum was established by veterans in 1982 to recognize the contributions of Elgin County to Canadian military history.

The museum recounts the stories of Elgin County residents (long or short term) from the War of 1812 to Afghanistan War. Exhibits include models made by craftsmen and a collection of some 600 United Nations and NATO badges. Exhibits are not confined to the interior as the museum has two M113 armored personnel carriers on permanent display outside.

== Menagerie ==
The Elgin Military Museum has space dedicated to an elephant, Jumbo, the largest elephant ever held in captivity. In 1985, in commemoration of the 100th anniversary of his death, a life-size monument named "Jumbo the Elephant (Bronnum)" was installed near the museum. This was the beginning of the menagerie, which also includes kangaroos and dolphins.

== HMCS Ojibwa ==
In 2012, the Elgin Military Museum acquired a former Oberon-class submarine, HMCS Ojibwa. The submarine is the largest artefact in the collection. As the city of St. Thomas is landlocked, ex-Ojibwa is located in Port Burwell, Ontario on Lake Erie. The Elgin Military Museum was the recipient of both the provincial and national tourism awards for the tours at ex-Ojibwa within its first year of operation.

== Vimy Ridge and the Vimy Poppy ==
A prominent artifact at the Elgin Military Museum is the Vimy Poppy, which was picked by a soldier from St. Thomas on Vimy Ridge a few weeks after the battle began on April 9, 1917, in memory of his fallen comrades. One of these soldiers was Lance Corporal Ellis Sifton who won the Victoria Cross that day but lost his life. The tiny box in which his effects were posted to his parents forms part of a display in his honour.

== Photos ==
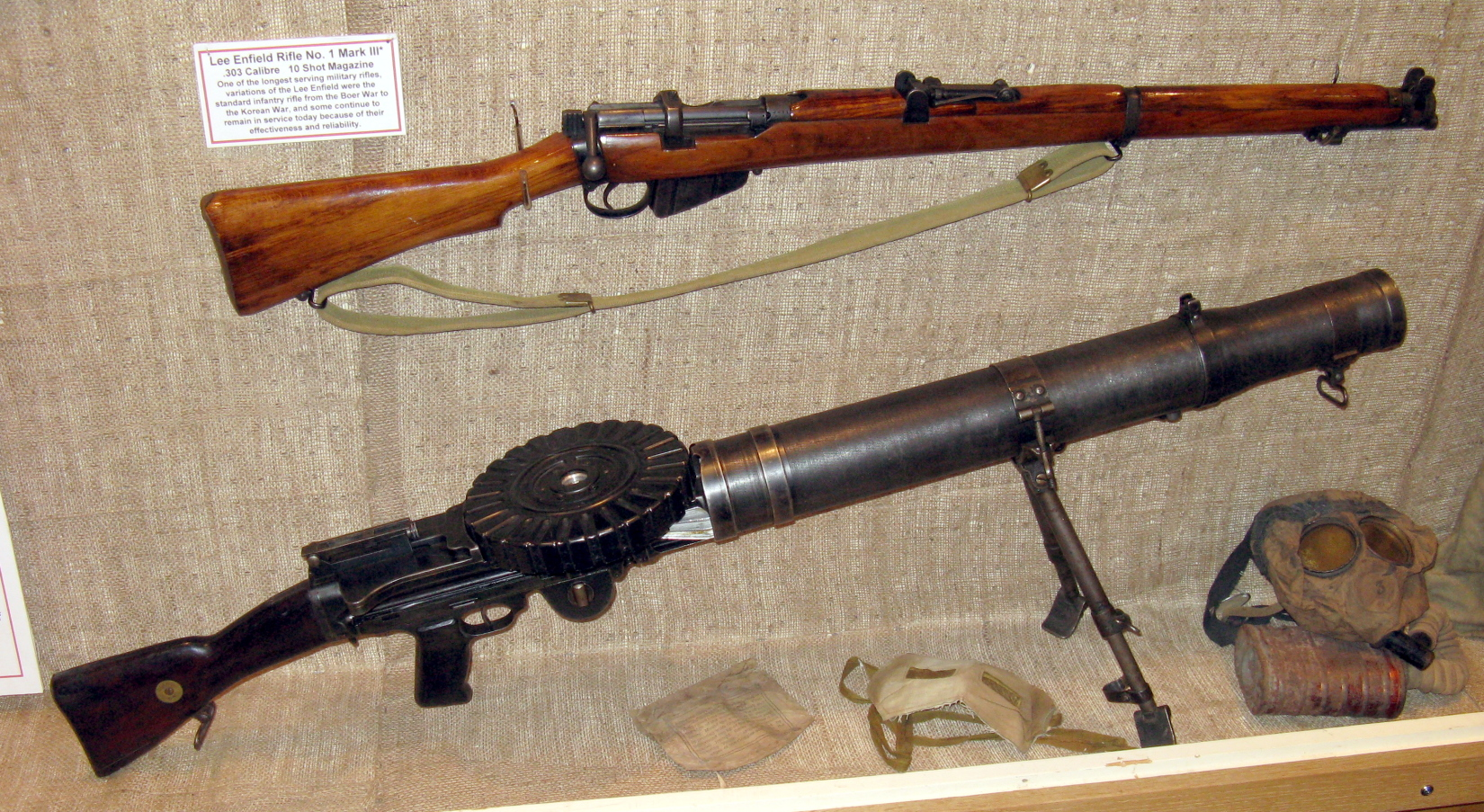
Lewis gun and Lee–Enfield No 1. Mk 2

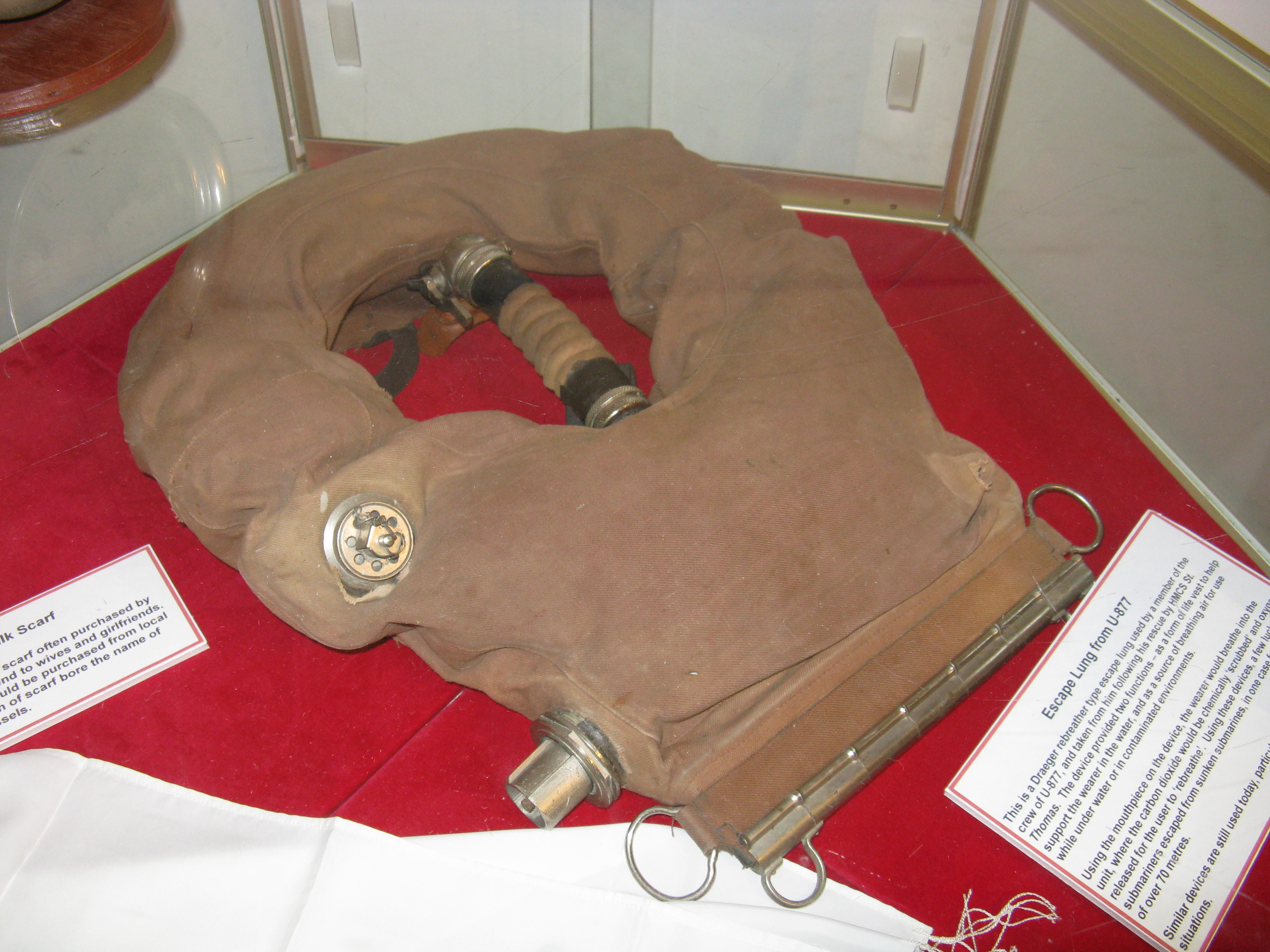
German U-boat escape lung

== See also ==
- Base Borden Military Museum
- Maritime Museum of the Atlantic
- National Air Force Museum of Canada
- Organization of Military Museums of Canada
- The Military Museums
- The Queen's Own Cameron Highlanders of Canada Museum
- Virtual Museum of Canada

== Affiliations ==
The museum is affiliated with: CMA, CHIN, OMMC and Virtual Museum of Canada.
