= Naval Museum of Manitoba =

- Musée Naval de Manitoba
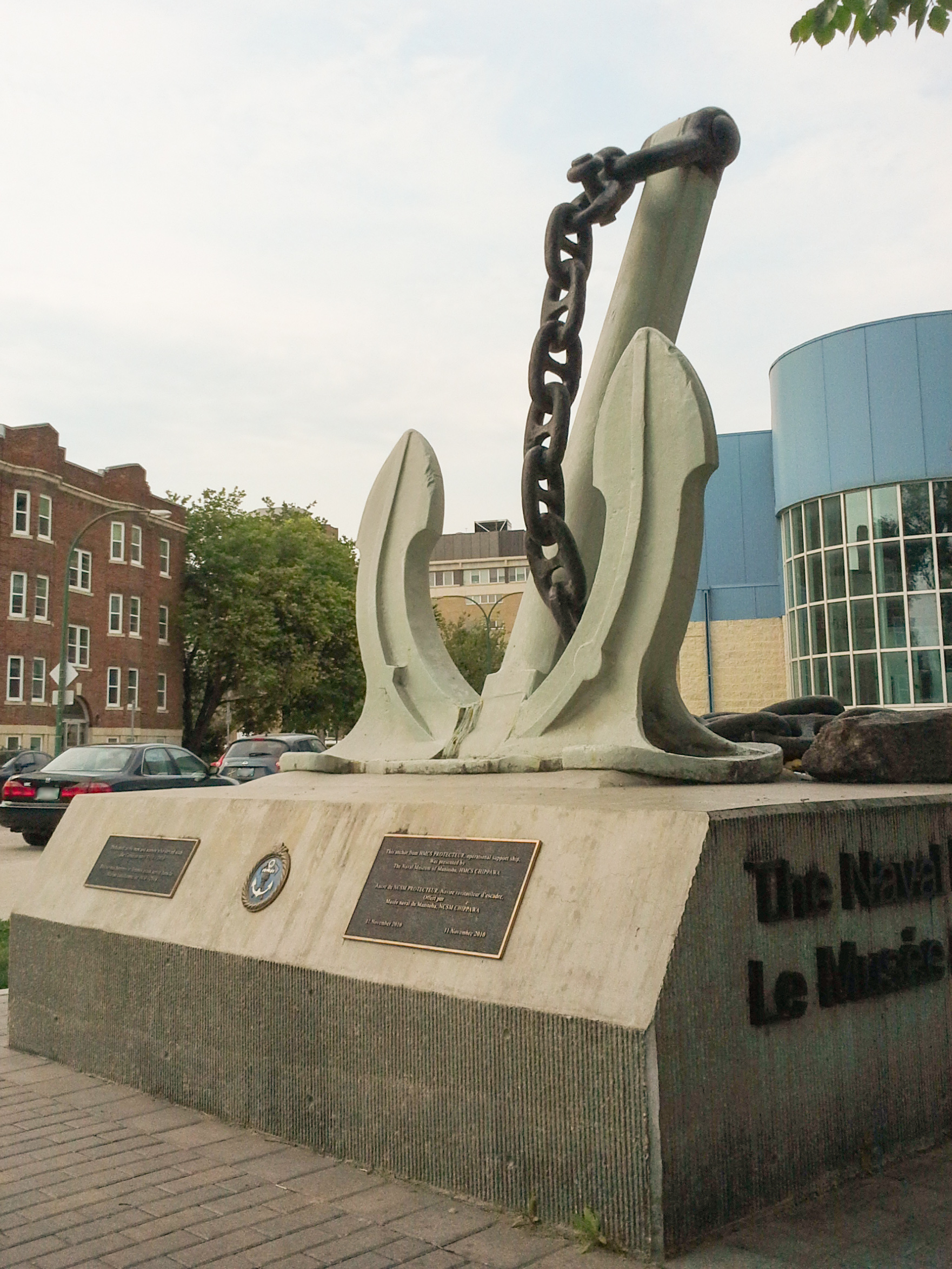
- Anchor statue outside of the Naval Museum of Manitoba
- Established: 1980
- Location: HMCS Chippawa, 1 Navy Way, Winnipeg, Manitoba, Canada
- Coordinates: 49.8863°N 97.1376°W
- Type: Naval museum
- Public transit access: 1, 2 Downtown Spirit; 29 Sherbrook; 34 McPhillips Express; 99
- Website: www.naval-museum.mb.ca

The Naval Museum of Manitoba is a museum in Winnipeg, Manitoba, dedicated to the Royal Canadian Navy and its influence on Manitoba. The museum first opened in 1980 in the former HMCS Chippawa building at 51 Navy Way in Winnipeg. The new museum is in the new HMCS Chippawa building, built in 1999, at 1 Navy Way in Winnipeg.

The Museum's Mission is: "to promote the history of the Royal Canadian Navy by telling its story through the preservation and display of many important artifacts; by honoring its place in the development and protection of Canada, her people and her oceans; and to inspire a desire for learning about the significant role which the prairies, and in particular Manitobans, have played in the unfolding of this drama. It dynamically displays ‘A Look to the Past, With a View to the Future!’"

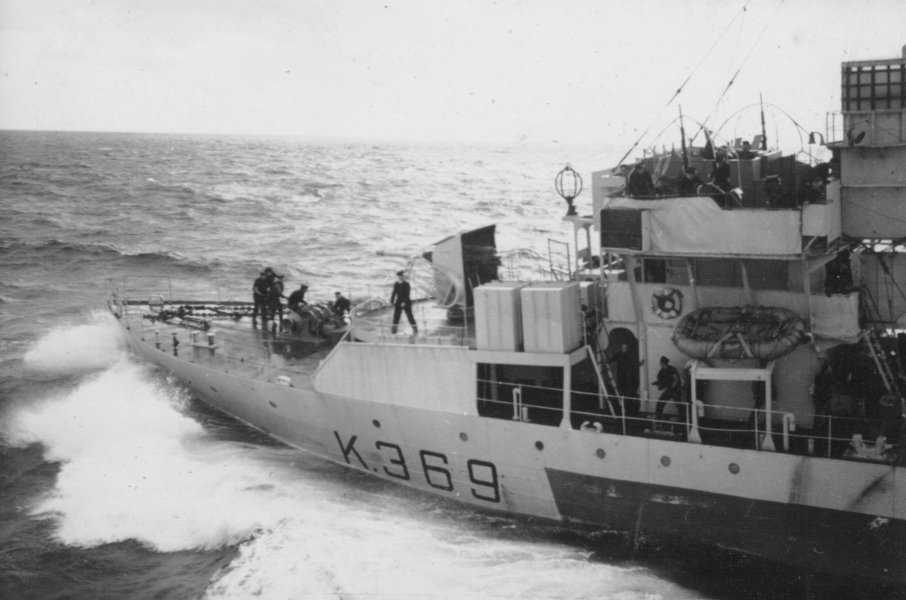
West york bow in collection of Naval Museum of Manitoba

The museum preserves the history of the navy through the collecting of documents, pictures, books, military artifacts, etc., pertaining to the Navy from the period of organization onwards. The museum provides a training facility to teach Naval and HMCS Chippawa history. It stimulates and fosters, within the general public, an interest in the Navy, its activities and accomplishments.

The Museum is affiliated with the CMA, the CHIN, and the Virtual Museum of Canada.

== See also ==
- Organization of Military Museums of Canada
