= Cold Lake Air Force Museum =

Military aviation museum in Alberta, Canada

- Established: 1998
- Location: Cold Lake, Alberta, Canada
- Coordinates: 54.435°N 110.181°W
- Type: CFB Cold Lake Museum
- Website: www.coldlakemuseums.org/air-force-museum.php

The Cold Lake Air Force Museum is a military aviation museum located in Cold Lake, Alberta. The museum preserves and exhibits the heritage and history of 4 Wing Cold Lake and 42 Radar Squadron. The Air Force Museum is actually one of four museums based on the old site of 42 Radar Squadron, who re-located to CFB Cold Lake in 1992. The Cold Lake Museums are connected to the Air Force Museum through a covered hallway dubbed 'The Tunnel'. All together, the museums are referred to as the Cold Lake Museums or the Tri-City Museums. The old facility of 42 Radar Squadron was decommissioned in 1992, and the museum opened its doors for the first time on July 1, 1998.

== Mission ==
The mission of the 4 Wing Cold Lake Air Force Museum is to preserve and display the history of 4 Wing Cold Lake and the squadrons and Units which have been, or will be stationed at, or affiliated with, 4 Wing Cold Lake and its antecedent formations. The museum is the focal point for Canadian Air Force research in the Cold Lake Region. The museum details the chronological development of the Royal Canadian Air Force, and associated Canadian Forces Units, in the Cold Lake Region. The museum also details the history and heritage of Canadian Forces Units associated with Cold Lake who served in Europe.

== History ==
A radome was reinstalled at the museum in May 2018.

== Aircraft ==
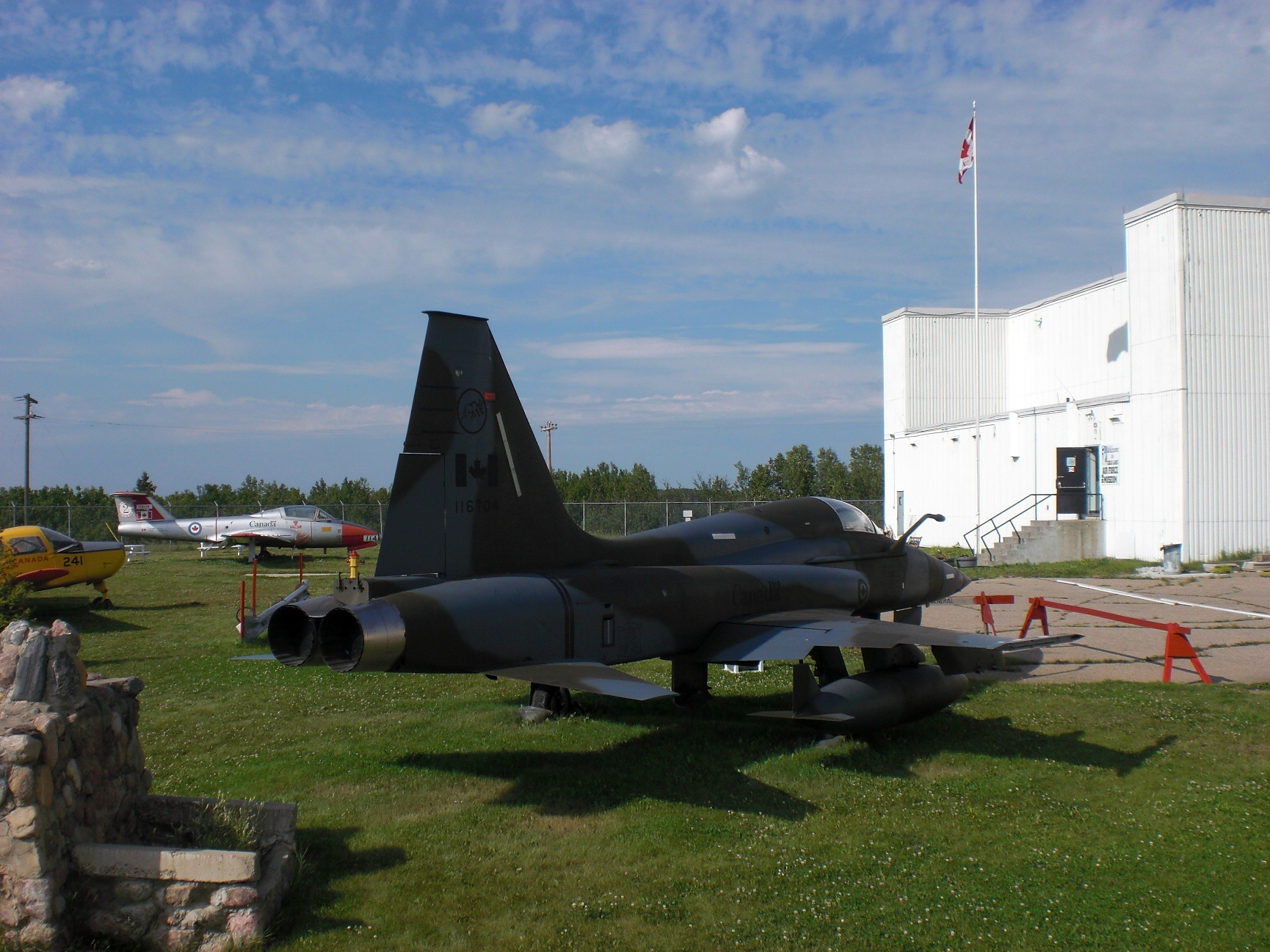
CF-5 at the Cold Lake Air Force Museum

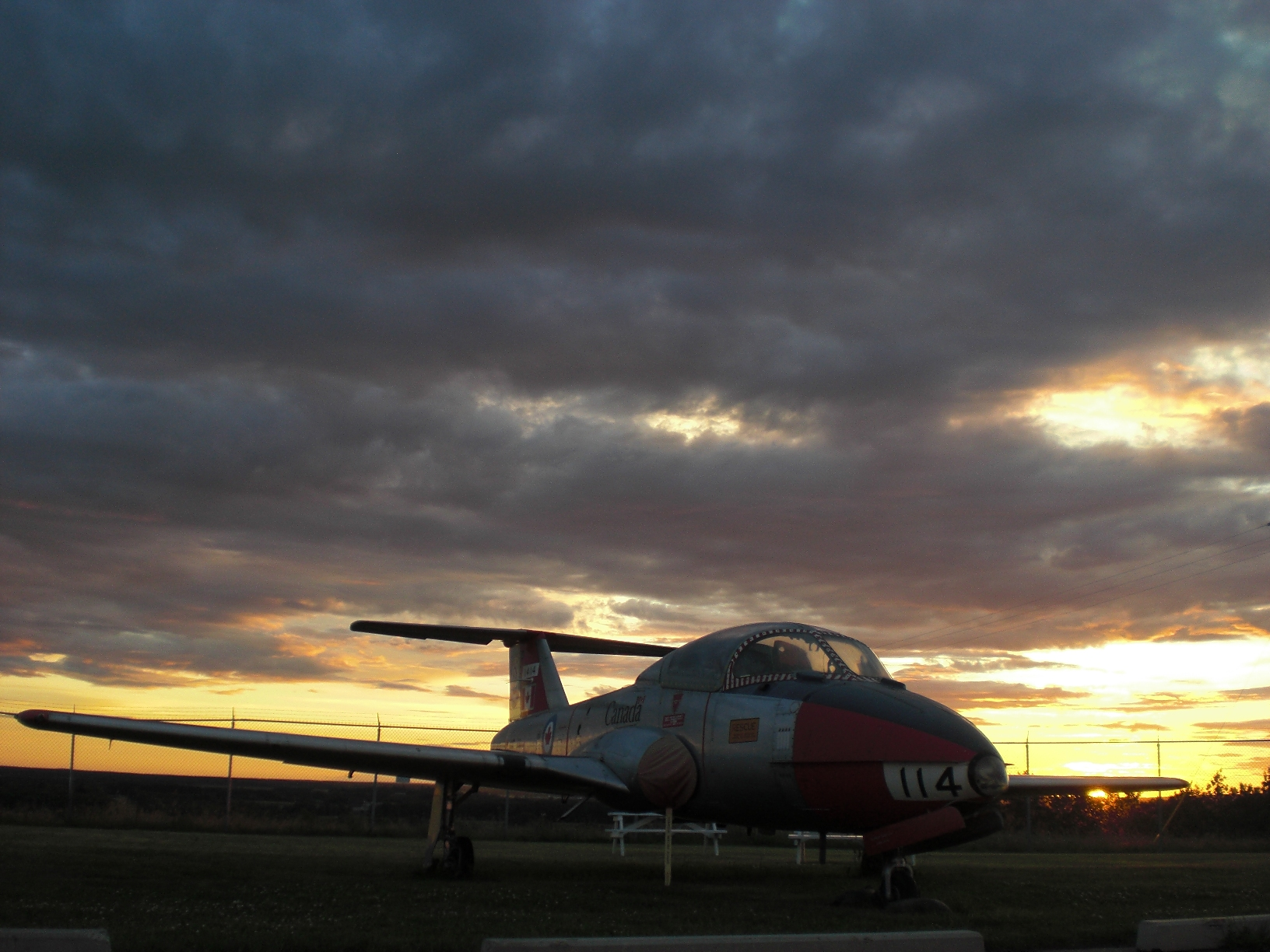
Canadair CT-114 Tutor

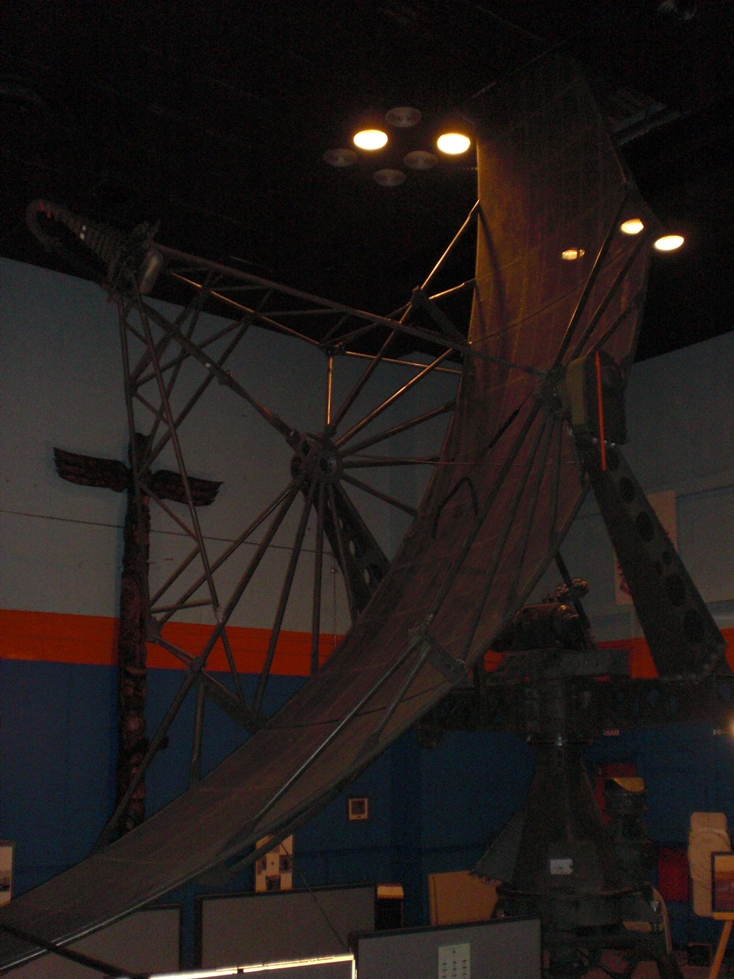
Height Finder Radar

Outside the museum where one drives up, there are several aircraft and a few trucks on display. Included are specific aircraft serials and histories.

- CF-5 Freedom Fighter – This aircraft (116704) served with 433 Squadron, 434 Squadron, and 419 Squadron. It finished its life with 419 Squadron and was sent into storage at CFB Mountain View in 1995. It was later shipped to the museum, and in 2007, it was assembled and painted in CAF Era Markings by 1 AMS.
- CT-133 Silver Star – This aircraft (133413) was one of the last T-birds flying. It was used by AETE until the summer of 2004 when it was given to the museum. It is finished overall grey with an AETE red 'X' on its tail.
- CT-134 Musketeer – aircraft (134241)
- CT-114 Tutor – This aircraft (114114) was used by the Snowbirds as Snowbird 9 in the 1977 season, Snowbird 10 in the 1978 season, and Snowbird 3 in 1979, 1980, 1981, 1982, 1983, 1984, 1985, and 1986 seasons. Finished in CAF Era Markings.

== Museum layout ==
When one enters the museum, the visitor's book and the Kitshop is what one sees first. The Kitshop sells memorabilia from 4 Wing squadrons, and also some items from the Cold Lake Museums. The first floor of the museum exhibits 4 Wing ground squadrons. The second floor exhibits, 4 Wing flying squadrons, Engines, a model of the base and a few other exhibits that have to do with 4 Wing.

The following exhibits are displayed at the Cold Lake Air Force Museum:

- 42 Radar Squadron
- No. 4 Airfield Engineers
- 1 Air Maintenance Squadron
- 4 Air Defence Regiment
- 4 Wing Hospital
- CHCL - The old Base Radio Station
- 4 Wing Fire Hall
- 409 Tactical Fighter Squadron
- 417 Combat Support Squadron
- 416 Tactical Fighter Squadron
- 441 Tactical Fighter Squadron
- 410 Tactical Fighter Training Squadron
- 419 Tactical Fighter Training Squadron
- 10 Field Technician Training Squadron
- Aerospace Engineering Test Establishment
- CFB Baden-Soellingen
- Equipment on display include: Orenda 9 (CF-100 Canuck engine), Rolls-Royce Nene 10 (CT-133 Silver Star engine), 2 J-85 engines (one from a CT-114 Tutor, the other from a CF-5), a Pontiac M39 cannon (CF-5 gun).

== Affiliations ==
The museum is affiliated with: CMA, CHIN, OMMC and Virtual Museum of Canada.

== See also ==
- CFB Cold Lake
- Cold Lake Museums
- Organization of Military Museums of Canada
- Military history of Canada
