= Commonwealth Air Training Plan Museum =

Aviation museum in Manitoba, Canada

- Location: Brandon, Manitoba
- Coordinates: 49.903786°N 99.942488°W
- Website: https://www.airmuseum.ca/

The Commonwealth Air Training Plan Museum is an aviation museum located at Brandon Municipal Airport, Brandon, Manitoba. It is dedicated to the memory of the airmen from the British Commonwealth Air Training Plan, who trained at World War II air stations across Canada. The museum is in stage 1 of redevelopment, which will see it restored to include the main hangar, medical building, chapel, H-hut aircrew barracks, motor pool building, canteen and interpretive center.

The museum contains several World War II aircraft, displays of navigation, pilot, bombardier, ground crew and transport equipment, various artifacts and a gift shop. The Commonwealth Air Training Plan Museum is on the Canadian Register of Historic Places.

== History ==
In 2014, the museum unveiled a memorial to Canadian airmen killed in World War II.

The museum temporarily closed in 2022 for structural repairs to its hangar. The museum unveiled renovated exhibits in April 2025. Plans included repainting the museum's Harvard and restoring its Bolingbroke. Two months later it announced the acquisition of three Noorduyn Norseman aircraft.

== Collection ==
=== Airplanes ===
Plane	Serial
Avro Anson	12518
Avro Anson	
Beechcraft Model 18	
Bristol Bolingbroke	9059
Bristol Bolingbroke (located at Comfort Inn)	9944
Cessna Crane	
de Havilland Tiger Moth	
Fairchild Cornell	
Fleet Fort	
Hawker Hurricane	5461
North American Harvard	
Stinson 108	
Westland Lysander (until 2003)	

=== Vehicles ===
Vehicle	Type
1940 Chrysler	staff car
1940 Chevrolet	staff car
1942 Ford	fuel tender
1942 Ford 1/x ton	general service
1944 Ford 6x6	crash truck
Ford tractor	tow
Jeep	utility
1942 FWD	snow blower
1942 FWD	snow blower

== Gallery ==
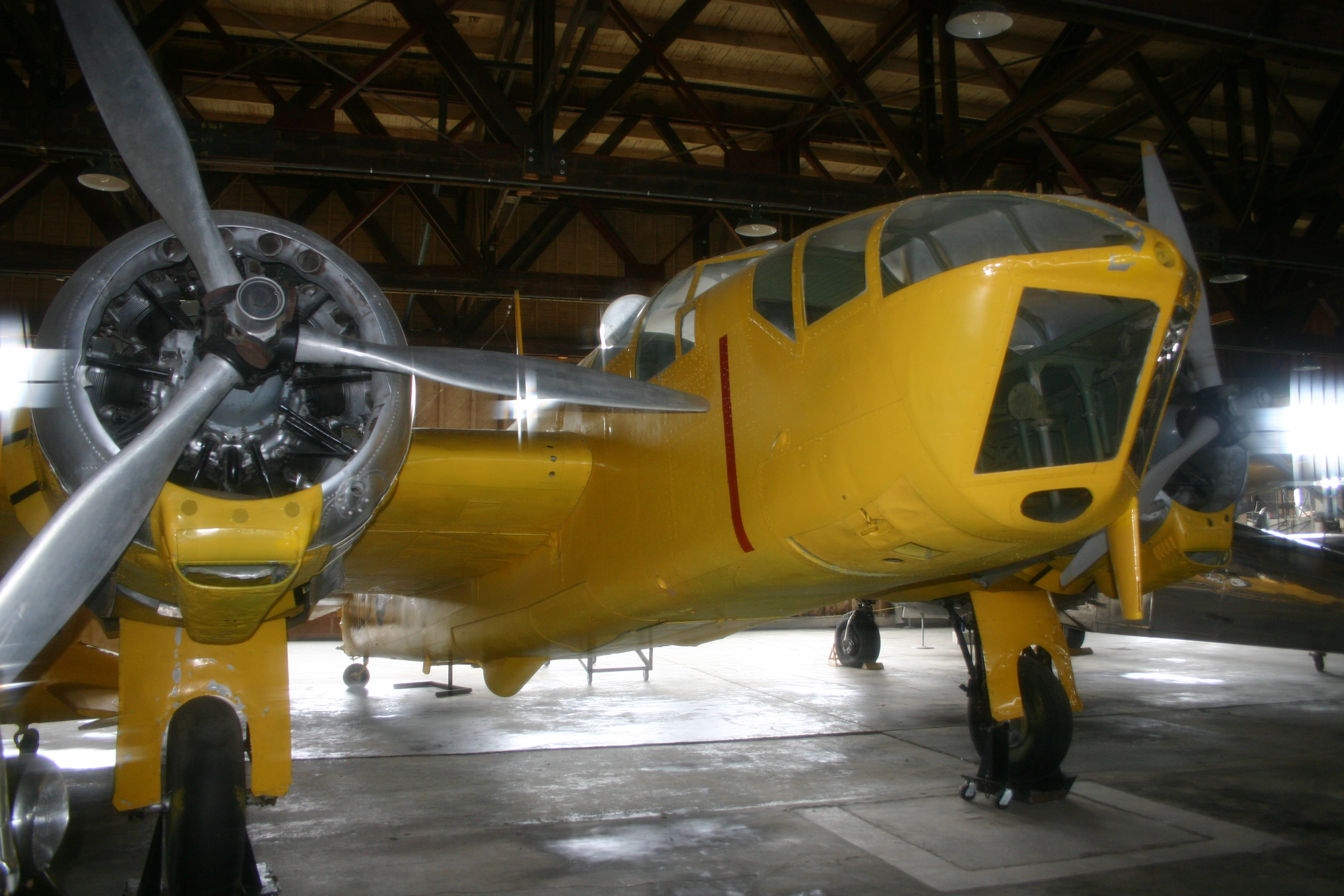
Bolingbroke at CATPM

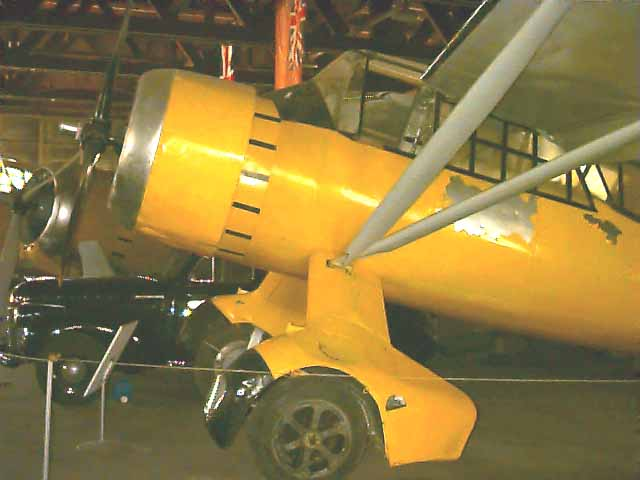
Westland Lysander at CATPM

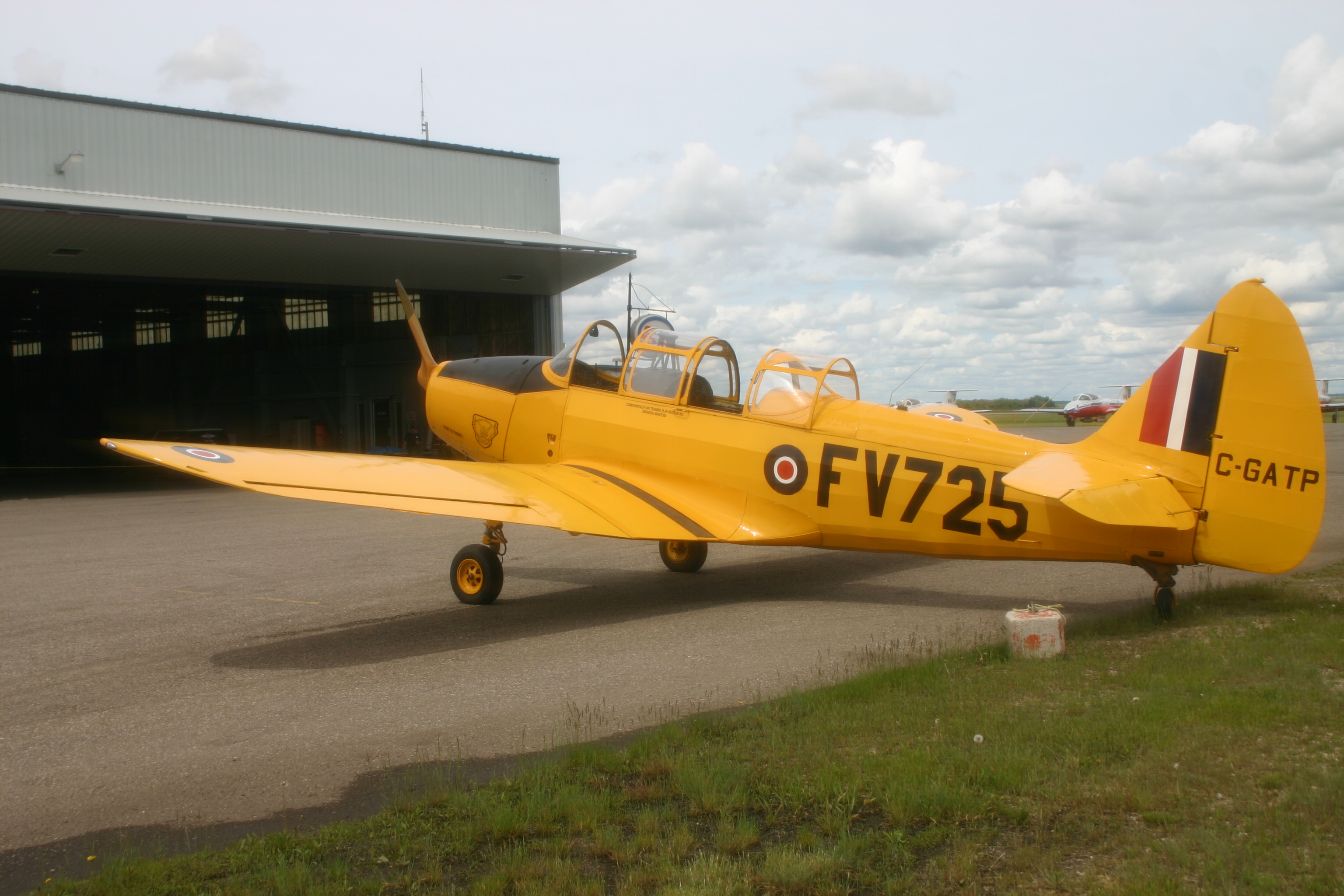
Fairchild Cornell at CATPM

== Affiliations ==
The Museum is affiliated with: CMA, CHIN, and Virtual Museum of Canada.

== See also ==
- Organization of Military Museums of Canada
- Military history of Canada
- History of the Royal Canadian Air Force
- List of aviation museums
