= CFB London =

Former Canadian Forces Base in Ontario

Coordinates: 43.0003°N 81.2322°W

Canadian Forces Base London (also CFB London) is a former Canadian Forces Base that was located in London, Ontario, Canada. It was downsized and closed during defence budget cutbacks in the 1990s. Local Primary Reserve units were supported by Area Support Unit (ASU) London which was located in some of the remaining base buildings, but they are now supported by ASU Toronto. Much of this support is delivered by a Technical Services Platoon which remains stationed in London.

As the site of the first purpose-built infantry training school erected by the federal government and an early symbol of the establishment of a permanent military force in Canada, Wolseley Hall was designated a National Historic Site of Canada in 1963.

== History ==
The Wolseley Barracks was established in the 1880s on the outskirts of London when the city traded the John Carling farm property on "Carling Heights" for the downtown Victoria Park, which had been owned and occupied by the military up to that time. Wolseley Barracks became the home of "D" Company of the (Canadian) Infantry School Corps with the completion of Wolseley Hall in 1888. The Infantry School Corps later became The Royal Canadian Regiment. Wolseley Hall was the first structure purposely built by the Canadian Government for a unit of the new Permanent Force. It was the headquarters of Number-1 District Depot in 1939 when war was declared on Germany. Servicemen with the prefix "A" in front of their Second World War service numbers were processed here.

Wolseley Barracks was named for Field Marshal Viscount Wolseley and was used for training regular and reserve units of the Canadian Army since its establishment. Various buildings were constructed on the property although many have since been demolished as the site reverts to civilian use. The two oldest structures on base are Wolseley Hall and the Royal School Building. The newest building on the property where the remaining logistics services of ASU London are consolidated, is the Captain Neil Logistics Facility.

Wolseley Barracks was renamed Canadian Forces Base London (CFB London) on April 1, 1966, in advance of the unification of all military services that would form the Canadian Forces.

Originally part of Material Command, CFB London supported the 27 Ordnance Depot and the First Battalion, The Royal Canadian Regiment (1RCR). On November 1, 1968, CFB London transferred to Mobile Command.

In 1971, the Highbury Complex, located on Highbury Avenue, became CFB London's maintenance and supply facility. The Highbury Complex was built during the Second World War as a military vehicle assembly plant and it was used for DND vehicle maintenance and supply activities after the war.

In 1992 the base was downsized from a Canadian Forces Base to a detachment of CFB Toronto. 1RCR moved later that year to CFB Petawawa.

On 1 April 1996 Detachment London closed. Garrison Support Unit London (GSU London) was subsequently established at Wolseley Barracks to provide the local Reserve, Cadet and remaining Regular Force units with administrative and logistical support as an element of Land Force Central Area. GSU London was renamed Area Support Unit London in 1998.

In addition to its 4th Battalion at ASU London, The Royal Canadian Regiment continues to maintain the Royal Canadian Regiment Museum at Wolseley Barracks, in the historic Wolseley Hall. A new ASU complex was built at Wolseley Barracks in 2006, replacing the Highbury Complex and some buildings on site.

The south half of the Wolseley Barracks and associated properties were sold off and redeveloped for housing. The former base gym is now the Carling Heights Optimist Community Centre. The buildings at the Highbury Complex were demolished in 2012.

== Closure of ASU London ==
In April 2012, the Department of National Defence announced that ASU London would be closed in the near future and their services transferred to ASU Toronto. As of July 2015 the closure and demolition plans are on indefinite hold.

== Heritage buildings ==
CFB London contains a recognized and a classified Federal Heritage building on the Register of the Government of Canada Heritage Buildings.

- Block A Classified - 1989; built 1886-1888
- Block O Recognized - 1992

== Bibliography ==
- Bruce Forsyth's Canadian Military History Page
