= CFB Cold Lake =

Royal Canadian Air Force base in Alberta, Canada

CFB Cold Lake Cold Lake/Group Captain R.W. McNair Airport
- Base des Forces canadiennes Cold Lake
- Cold Lake, Alberta in Canada
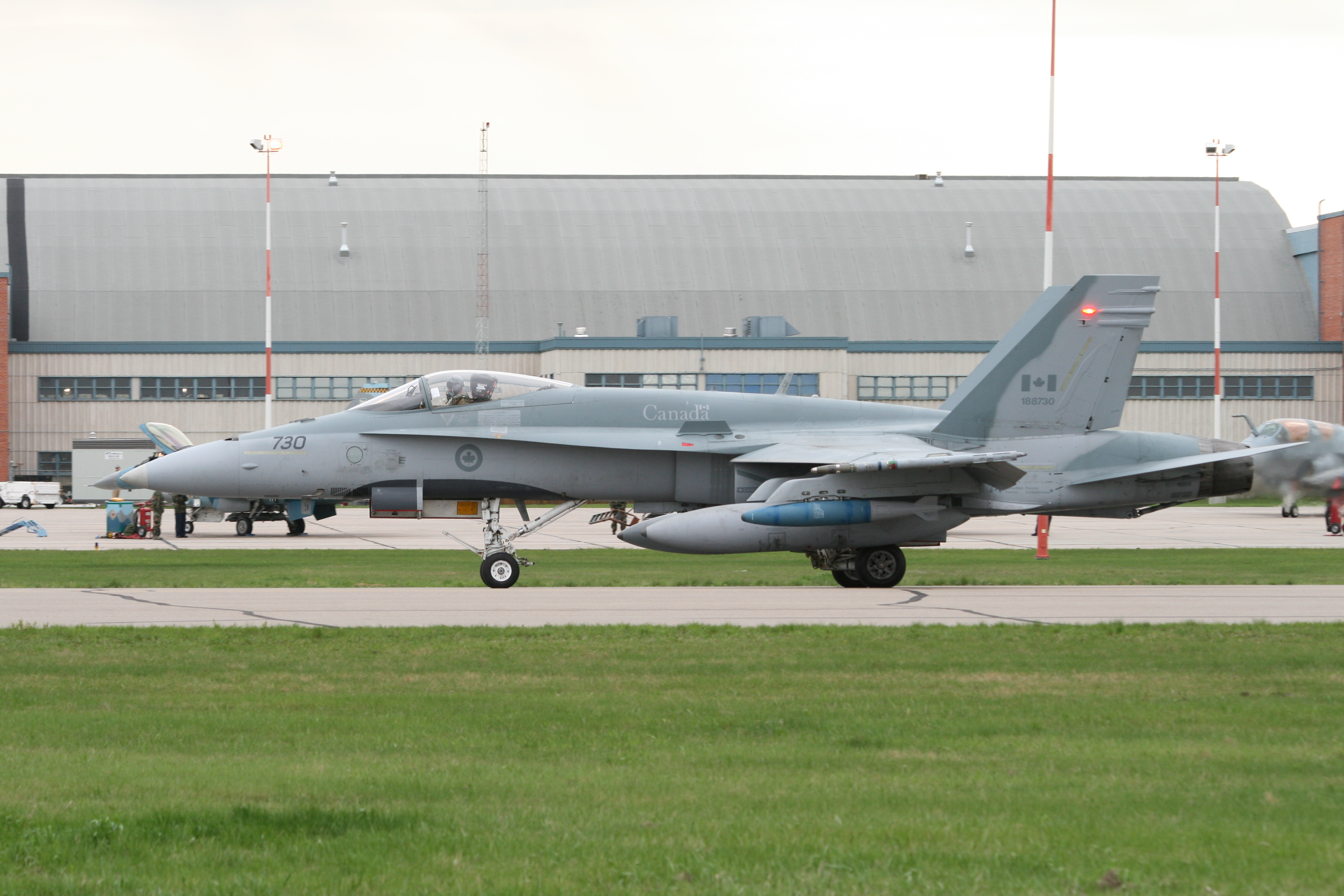
- A CF-18 Hornet of the Royal Canadian Air Force at CFB Cold Lake

Site information
- Type: Canadian Forces base
- Owner: Department of National Defence
- Operator: Royal Canadian Air Force
- Controlled by: 1 Canadian Air Division
- Condition: Operational
- Website: Official website

Location
- Location in Alberta Cold Lake (Canada)
- Coordinates: 54°24′19″N 110°16′56″W

Site history
- Built: 1952 – 1954
- In use: 1954 – present
- Events: Exercise Maple Flag

Garrison information
- Current commander: Colonel Mark Hickey, MSM, CD
- Garrison: 4 Wing

Airfield information
- Identifiers: IATA: YOD, ICAO: CYOD, WMO: 711200
- Elevation: 541 m (1,775 ft) AMSL
Runways
Direction	Length and surface
13L/31R	3,840 m (12,599 ft) Asphalt
13R/31L	3,048 m (9,999 ft) Asphalt
04/22	2,522 m (8,273 ft) Asphalt
- Source: Canada Flight Supplement

Canadian Forces Base Cold Lake (IATA: YOD, ICAO: CYOD), abbreviated as CFB Cold Lake, is a Canadian Forces Base in the City of Cold Lake, Alberta.

The facility is operated as an air force base by the Royal Canadian Air Force (RCAF) and is approximately 35 km (22 mi) south of the Cold Lake Air Weapons Range (CLAWR), which is used as practicing grounds by CFB Cold Lake's fighter pilots. The base is one of two in the country housing the CF-18 Hornet fighter, the other being CFB Bagotville. The base's primary RCAF lodger unit is 4 Wing, commonly referred to as 4 Wing Cold Lake.

Civilian passenger service was available through the Medley passenger terminal on the air base. The regularly scheduled air service between Calgary and the civilian terminal was cancelled in June 2011. Unscheduled civilian air traffic is usually directed to Cold Lake Regional Airport.

The facility is named Cold Lake/Group Captain R.W. McNair Airport after World War II Spitfire ace Robert Wendell "Buck" McNair. It is one of three military aerodromes in Canada to be named after an individual, along with Valcartier (W/C J.H.L. (Joe) Lecomte) Heliport and Moose Jaw/Air Vice Marshal C.M. McEwen Airport.

The airport is classified as an airport of entry by Nav Canada and is staffed by the Canada Border Services Agency; however, its use by international flights is currently restricted to military aircraft and personnel.

== History ==
Construction of what would become known as RCAF Station Cold Lake began in 1952 at the height of the Cold War after a nearby site in Alberta's "Lakeland District" was chosen by the RCAF for the country's premier air weapons training base. The chosen location for the base was west of the former Town of Grand Centre (now part of the City of Cold Lake), and was based on factors such as low population density, accessibility, weather, suitable terrain, and nearby available land for air weapons training. Although the location of the range attempted to avoid First Nations reserves, it "encompassed traditional Aboriginal and treaty areas and the First Nations affected by the creation of the CLAWR were eventually compensated."

Personnel arrived at Cold Lake on March 31, 1954, with operations at RCAF Station Cold Lake beginning that day. The following year, the federal government signed an agreement with the provinces of Saskatchewan and Alberta for use of a tract of land measuring 180 km by 65 km covering an area of 11,700 square kilometres. This became known as the CLAWR and is the raison d'être for the location of the base.

CLAWR is the northern equivalent to the United States Air Force's (USAF) Nellis Air Force Range and provides a different training environment with heavy boreal forest and numerous lakes more closely resembling European terrain. It hosts over 640 actual targets and 100 realistic target complexes, including 7 simulated aerodromes with runways, tarmac, aircraft, dispersal areas and buildings, as well as mechanized military equipment such as tanks, simulated radar and missile launching sites, mock industrial sites, and command and control centres.

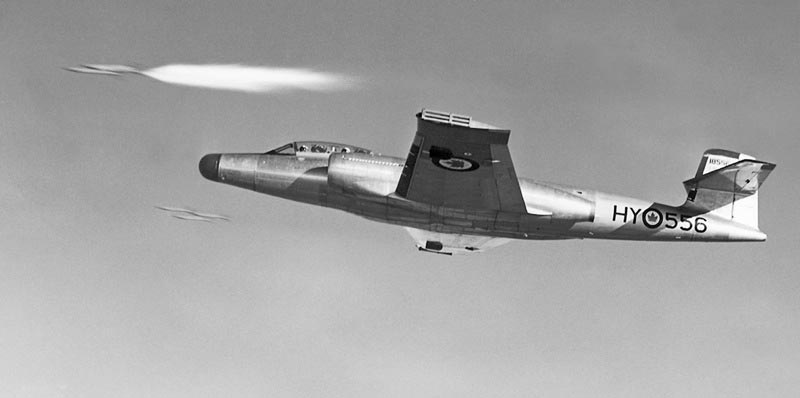
Weapons Practice Unit CF-100 Mk 5 firing rockets at first annual Air Defence Command rocket meet, Cold Lake, September 1957

Operations in the 1950s and early 1960s centred around training crews destined for the CF-100 Canuck all-weather interceptor, which was in operational use in Canada and Western Europe. From 1962 onwards, the arrival of the CF-104 Starfighter resulted in a change of task to the training pilots for Canada's NATO commitment in West Germany, which continued until the arrival of the CF-18 Hornet in 1982. Since then, the base has been the training focal point for this aircraft, in addition to operational squadrons being located here.

On February 1, 1968, the RCAF was merged with the Royal Canadian Navy and Canadian Army to form the unified Canadian Forces. RCAF Station Cold Lake saw its name changed to CFB Cold Lake and became the responsibility of Air Defence Command. ADC and several other CF commands transformed in 1975 to become Air Command (AIRCOM).

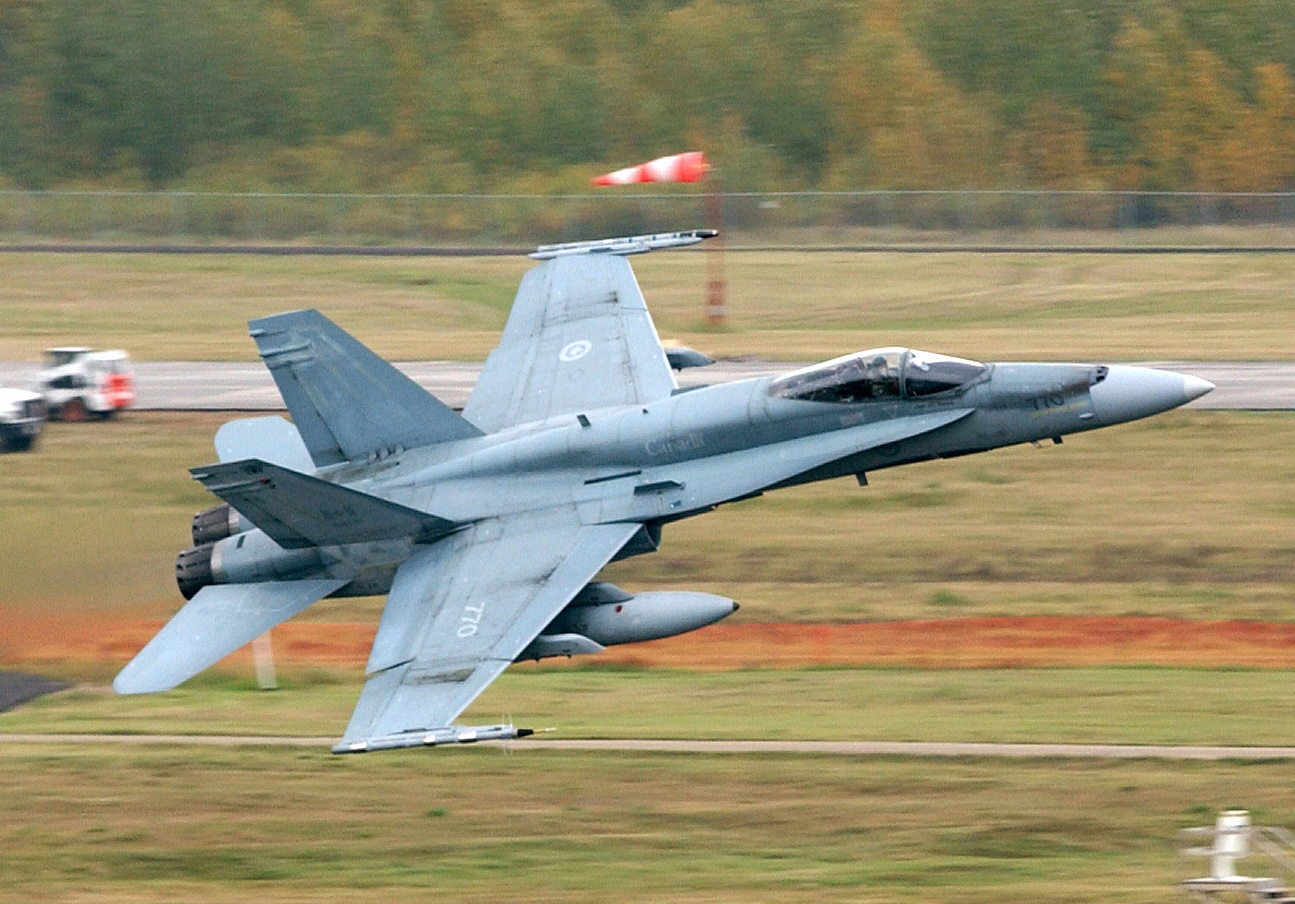
A CF-18 Hornet takes off from CFB Cold Lake during the second Tiger Meet of the Americas, 2003.

During the 1980s, CFB Cold Lake was thrust into the international media spotlight when CLAWR was used as the target for testing of the newly developed AGM-86 Tomahawk air-launched cruise missiles by the USAF. These missiles were launched from strategic bombers over the Beaufort Sea and travelled up the Mackenzie River valley, closely following the terrain at elevations of several metres above ground level. The tests caused significant controversy among peace activists and local First Nations on the projected flight paths since the new untested weapons were considered a destabilizing force in the international arms race, potentially contributing to instability worldwide. The Federal Court of Canada ruled in favour of allowing the tests to proceed in 1983 and the Canada–United States Test and Evaluation Program or CANUSTEP agreement was subsequently signed between both nations, allowing for the cruise missile tests to use Canadian airspace in the Northwest Territories and Alberta en route to CLAWR.

In 1990, 18 sounding rockets were launched.

In 1995, the United States Air Force's 366th Air Base Wing, Mountain Home Air Force Base, Idaho, deployed to CFB Cold Lake for the 366th's Operational Readiness Inspection exercise. The deployment lasted approximately 14 days and consisted of three fighter and numerous support squadrons airlifting enough logistics and personnel to CFB Cold Lake to simulate setting up a frontline combat air base and initiating combat operations.

In 2000/2001, several of the base's buildings were put on the Register of the Government of Canada Heritage Buildings: Hangars 1, 2, 3, 4, 6 and the Senior NCO's Building B-30.

In 2007, the base was the setting for Jetstream, a TV series depicting eight pilots training under the 410 Tactical Fighter Training Squadron to fly a CF-18.

On August 27, 2020, the Government of Canada awarded EllisDon, Edmonton, with the $9.2 million construction of new facilities to house the RCAF's future fighter. The future fighter, to be housed at CFB Cold Lake and CFB Bagotville, will require facility upgrades before the first delivery of the fighter in 2025.

== Current use ==
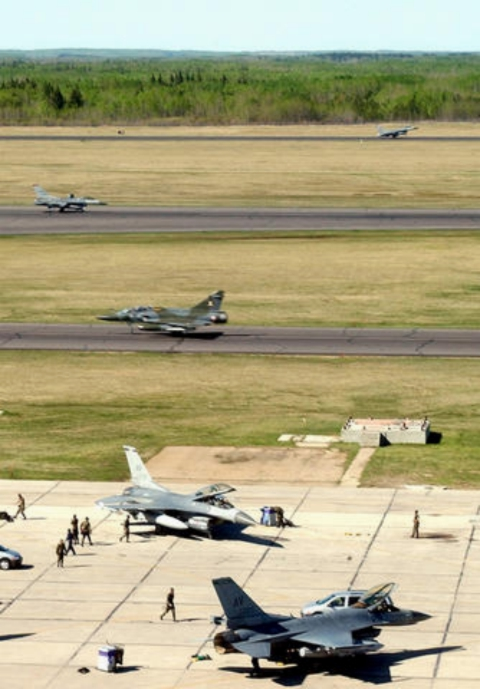
Cold Lake, with the ramp, taxiway A, runway 31R/13L and runway 31L/13R from front to back. The concrete object is the footing for the old ATC tower.

As of 2023, CFB Cold Lake has the following units of 4 Wing stationed at the facility:

- 401 Tactical Fighter Squadron (CF-18 Hornet)
- 409 Tactical Fighter Squadron (CF-18 Hornet)
- 410 Tactical Fighter Operational Training Squadron (CF-18 Hornet)
- 417 Combat Support Squadron (CH-146 Griffon)
- 1 Air Maintenance Squadron
- 42 Radar Squadron
- 10 Field Technical Training Squadron

It also hosts a number of other lodger units, including the Aerospace Engineering Testing Establishment, 4 Construction Engineering Squadron, 1 Military Police Squadron, Real Property Operations Detachment Cold Lake, 22 Health Services Centre, as well as Alpha Jets and A-4 Skyhawks operated by civilian contractor Top Aces.

In addition to its use as a training base, CFB Cold Lake's fighter/interceptor aircraft defend the western half of Canadian air space and together with aircraft from CFB Bagotville cover Canada's Arctic territory. They are operationally controlled by NORAD from CFB North Bay and Cheyenne Mountain Operations Center in Colorado Springs. Cold Lake aircraft forward deploy to airfields throughout western and Arctic Canada as operational requirements dictate.

Cold Lake also hosts NATO flight training operating from 15 Wing Moose Jaw, as well as 5 Wing Goose Bay. Maple Flag is a major international air weapons training competition hosted annually by CFB Cold Lake in May–June, making use of CLAWR. The name is derived from the USAF's Red Flag training exercises at the Nellis Air Force Range in Nevada. NASA and ESA astronauts use Cold Lake for winter survival training.

=== Cadet Training Centre ===
Cold Lake Cadet Training Centre (CLCTC) is at 4 Wing Cold Lake, held annually from June through August. The primary goal at CLCTC is the provision of a safe and challenging national summer training program. The Senior Leaders Course (SLC) moved to CFB Cold Lake in 1973. From 1973 to 1987, SLC was the only course offered at Cold Lake until the Survival School (which hosts two courses: Survival Instructor and Basic Survival) relocated there in 1988. At that time the two schools existed separately with two separate commanding officers. By 1989, the two united under one commanding officer and became Cold Lake Cadet Camp (CLCC). In 1993, the camp added a third school, the Cadet Service Band, which ran for one year as both a Band and SLC but has now become solely a band program. These three schools make up CLCTC. The entire Cold Lake Cadet Training Centre has a staff of approximately 205 staff cadets, officers, civilian instructors, regular force, and civilian contract personnel, from all elements of the Cadet Program and from all regions of Canada. The summer 2010 introduced an entirely new school to CLCTC: The Fitness School which also implemented the first Basic Fitness and Sports Course to CLCTC. The Basic Fitness and Sports is a three-week course that encourages physical fitness and teaches cadets to be fitness and sports advisors in their home squadrons/units/corps. After the summer of 2010, the single, national, Senior Leaders Course was discontinued in favour of the Leadership and Ceremonial Instructors Course to be offered in each region. The summer of 2011 introduced a new six week seniors course to the Fitness School; Fitness and Sports Instructor Course (FSIC). The new FSIC teaches cadets to be Fitness and Sports Instructors within their home squadrons/units/corps. Due to the COVID-19 Pandemic, CLCTC was not used during 2020, or 2021. Cadet Summer Training resumed in 2022, with CLCTC hosting Fitness and Sports Instructor (FSI), Advanced Aviation (AA), Survival Instructor (SI), and Drill and Ceremonial Instructor (DCI), which is the successor to the original Senior Leaders Course (SLC) hosted at CLCTC between 1973 and 2010, bringing a Leadership and Drill course back to the CLCTC for the first time in 12 years. Since 2024, CLCTC has only been running Introduction to Survival (ITS), Survival Instructor (SI), Advanced Aviation (AA), and Aviation Technology & Aerospace (ATA) courses.

=== 4 Wing Brass and Reed Band ===
CFB Cold Lake sports a unit band that serves under the auspices of the 4 Wing of the RCAF. The band in its modern form was established in November 1982 after a resolution by the National Defence Headquarters in Ottawa. It performs public duties for the base as well as the city of Cold Lake and what was formerly Lakeland County.

The following have served as bandmasters for the band:

- Eric "Rick" Watson (1978–1985)
- Jeff Gaye (1990–2009)
- Cam Martin (2014–2015)
- Jeremy Duggleby (since 2015)

== Non-military use of the CLAWR ==
Non-military use of the CLAWR has increased since the 1990s, and "will continue to grow as various sectors vie for access to airspace, land and resources (such as natural gas, commercial fishing, and logging) in and around the range". Canadian Natural Resources's Primrose and Wolf Lake in situ oil sands project near Cold Lake use sa high pressure cyclic steam stimulation and steam-assisted gravity drainage extraction methods. Other producers, such as Cenovus Energy, are also utilizing parts of the CLAWR.

Indigenous groups frequent the traditional hunting grounds as part of the agreed usage with the Department of National Defence.

== See also ==
- Cold Lake Air Force Museum
- Cold Lake Regional Airport
- Improvement District No. 349, the former improvement district that was largely coextensive with the Cold Lake Air Weapons Range
