= Organization of Military Museums of Canada =

Organization of Military Museums of Canada Inc.
- Established: 1967
- Location: Calgary, Alberta, Canada
- Website: www.ommcinc.ca

The Organization of Military Museums of Canada (OMMC) is a national organization for the promotion of military museums in Canada. It was established in 1967 by a group of military museums, historians, and military history enthusiasts. The organization boasts over 40 individual and 60 institutional members, which include Canadian Forces museums, Parks Canada sites, as well as federal, provincial, and municipal museums. The OMMC is a registered, charitable, non-profit organization that was incorporated in 1992.

Anne Lindsay serves as the President of OMMC Inc. as of 2022. The OMMC's Head Office is located in Calgary, Alberta, Canada.

The OMMC acts as an umbrella organization for Canadian museums whose main purpose is the preservation and display of military artifacts. It also supports other interested institutions and individuals. The OMMC is a federally incorporated, not-for-profit institution.

== Programs ==
The OMMC is an association of peoples and organizations who operate military museums, promote the Military history of Canada, preserve and display military artifacts and militaria, and re-enact military operations.

One of the key projects undertaken by the OMMC was the Inventory of Canadian Military Memorials in Canada, which aimed to identify and record all Canadian military memorials as part of a millennium project.

The OMMC provides various courses, meetings, and other opportunities for its members to address common problems, learn new methods in museological practice, and enhance the historical knowledge of museum staffs. The organization's newsletter is called The Bulletin.

== Partners ==
The OMMC's partners include the Canadian Museums Association (CMA). Member organizations partner with local heritage organizations.

== History ==
The Organization of Military Museums of Canada was incorporated in 1992. The OMMC fosters public awareness and promotes the enjoyment of Canada's military history. The "Bezeau Report", the OMMC strategic plan was presented to the membership in 1998.

== Member Museums in Canada include ==
| Name | Province | Town/City | Regions | Type | Summary |
|---|---|---|---|---|---|
| Aero Space Museum | Alberta | Calgary | Calgary | Aerospace | Military and civilian aircraft |
| Alberta Aviation Museum | Alberta | Edmonton | Edmonton Capital | Aerospace | Military and civilian aircraft |
| Bomber Command Museum of Canada | Alberta | Nanton | Southern | Aerospace | website |
| Cold Lake Air Force Museum | Alberta | Cold Lake | Central | Aerospace | |
| Loyal Edmonton Regiment Museum | Alberta | Edmonton | Edmonton Capital | Military | website, history of the Loyal Edmonton Regiment |
| The Military Museums | Alberta | Calgary | Calgary | Military | Canada's army, air force, and navy |
| 2 Intelligence Company and Camp X Museum | Ontario | Toronto | Greater Toronto Area | Military | History of 2 Intelligence Company and Camp X from 1903 to the present day |
| 5th (BC) Artillery Regiment Museum | British Columbia | Victoria | Capital | Military | History of coast artillery and associated units from 1861 to the present day |
| 12 Service Battalion Museum | British Columbia | Richmond | Metro Vancouver | Military | |
| Ashton Garrison Museum | British Columbia | Victoria | Capital | Military | website |
| Canadian Military Education Centre | British Columbia | Chilliwack | Fraser Valley | Military | website |
| Canadian Scottish Regiment (Princess Mary's) Regimental Museum | British Columbia | Victoria | Capital | Military | |
| CFB Esquimalt Naval & Military Museum | British Columbia | Esquimalt | Capital | Military | website, history and heritage of the naval presence on Canada's West Coast and of the military on Southern Vancouver Island |
| Hatley Park National Historic Site | British Columbia | Colwood | Capital | Historic house | Early 20th-century Scottish Baronial-style castle mansion, site of Royal Roads Military College |
| Maritime Museum of British Columbia | British Columbia | Victoria | Capital | Maritime | |
| Nikkei Internment Memorial Centre | British Columbia | New Denver | Central Kootenay | Military | History of the Japanese Canadians that were relocated to internment camps during World War II |
| Okanagan Military Museum | British Columbia | Kelowna | Central Okanagan | Military | website |
| Regimental Museum of the BC Regiment | British Columbia | Vancouver | Metro Vancouver | Military | History and artifacts of The British Columbia Regiment (Duke of Connaught's Own) |
| Rocky Mountain Rangers Museum | British Columbia | Kamloops | Thompson-Nicola | Military | website, located in the JR Vicars Armoury, history of The Rocky Mountain Rangers |
| Royal Westminster Regiment Historical Society and Museum | British Columbia | New Westminster | Metro Vancouver | Military | |
| Seaforth Highlanders of Canada Regimental Museum and Archives | British Columbia | Vancouver | Metro Vancouver | Military | |
| Vancouver Holocaust Education Center | British Columbia | Vancouver | Metro Vancouver | Holocaust | website |
| Vancouver Island Military Museum | British Columbia | Nanaimo | Nanaimo | Military | website |
| Vancouver Maritime Museum | British Columbia | Vancouver | Metro Vancouver | Maritime | |
| 12th Manitoba Dragoons Museum | Manitoba | Brandon | Westman | Military | website, history of the 26th Field Artillery Regiment, Royal Canadian Artillery |
| Air Force Heritage Museum and Air Park | Manitoba | Winnipeg | Winnipeg Capital | Aerospace | information, museum open by appointment |
| Commonwealth Air Training Plan Museum | Manitoba | Brandon | Westman | Aerospace | World War II aircraft, British Commonwealth Air Training Plan, R.C.A.F. |
| The Fort Garry Horse Museum and Archives | Manitoba | Winnipeg | Winnipeg Capital | Army | website |
| Marine Museum of Manitoba | Manitoba | Selkirk | Interlake | Maritime | Includes several museum ships |
| Naval Museum of Manitoba | Manitoba | Winnipeg | Winnipeg Capital | Military | |
| RCA Museum | Manitoba | Brandon | Westman | Military | website, located at CFB Shilo, also known as Canada's National Artillery Museum |
| Royal Winnipeg Rifles Regimental Museum | Manitoba | Winnipeg | Winnipeg Capital | Military | website, history of the Royal Winnipeg Rifles |
| Queen's Own Cameron Highlanders of Canada Museum | Manitoba | Winnipeg | Winnipeg Capital | Military | |
| Western Canada Aviation Museum | Manitoba | Winnipeg | Winnipeg Capital | Aerospace | Military and civilian aircraft |
| 8th Hussars Regimental Museum | New Brunswick | Sussex | Kings | Military | History of the regiment |
| Canadian Forces Base Gagetown Military Museum | New Brunswick | Oromocto | Sunbury | Military | website, history of CFB Gagetown and the military presence in Oromocto |
| Canadian Military Engineers Museum | New Brunswick | Oromocto | Sunbury | Military | website, work and role of the Canadian Military Engineers in Canada |
| Carleton Martello Tower | New Brunswick | Saint John | Saint John | Military | Includes restored powder magazine, restored barracks room and exhibits about the fort |
| Fort Beauséjour – Fort Cumberland National Historic Site | New Brunswick | Aulac | Westmorland | Military | Site of two notable 18th-century battles |
| Herman J. Good V.C Branch No.18 Royal Canadian Legion War Museum | New Brunswick | Bathurst | Gloucester | Military | information, information |
| New Brunswick Internment Camp Museum | New Brunswick | Minto | Queens | History | website, artifacts and history of the WWII internment camp |
| Petitcodiac War Museum | New Brunswick | Three Rivers | Westmorland | Military | information |
| St. Andrews Blockhouse National Historic Site | New Brunswick | St. Andrews | Charlotte | Military | website, restored early 19th-century blockhouse with exhibits |
| Labrador Military Museum | Newfoundland and Labrador | Happy Valley-Goose Bay | Labrador | Aviation | information, items from the Canadian, American, Dutch, German, and British Air Forces |
| Quidi Vidi Battery | Newfoundland and Labrador | St. John's | | Military | website, artillery battery during the War of 1812 |
| Royal Canadian Legion Military Museum | Newfoundland and Labrador | Grand Falls-Windsor | | Military | information, information, operated by the Royal Canadian Legion Branch 12 |
| Royal Newfoundland Regiment Museum | Newfoundland and Labrador | Pleasantville | | Military | information, history of the Royal Newfoundland Regiment |
| Atlantic Canada Aviation Museum | Nova Scotia | Enfield | Halifax Regional Municipality Metro Halifax | Aviation | Atlantic Canada's aviation heritage |
| Cornwallis Military Museum | Nova Scotia | Clementsport | Annapolis Annapolis Valley | Military | website, history of the CFB Cornwallis |
| Debert Military Museum | Nova Scotia | Debert | Colchester Fundy Shore | Military | Military artifacts and history of CFS Debert |
| Fortress of Louisbourg | Nova Scotia | Louisbourg | Cape Breton Cape Breton Island | Living | Reconstructed 18th-century French fortified town |
| Greenwood Military Aviation Museum | Nova Scotia | Greenwood | Kings Annapolis Valley | Aviation | website, military aviation in Atlantic Canada |
| Halifax Citadel National Historic Site | Nova Scotia | Halifax Halifax Regional Municipality | Metro Halifax | Military | 19th-century fort with living history demonstrations |
| HMCS Sackville | Nova Scotia | Halifax | Halifax Regional Municipality Metro Halifax | Maritime | 1940s WWII museum ship of a Flower-class corvette, open in summer |
| Highlander Museum | Nova Scotia | Sydney | Cape Breton Cape Breton Island | Military | website, history of the 2nd Battalion, Nova Scotia Highlanders |
| Maritime Command Museum | Nova Scotia | Halifax | Halifax Regional Municipality Metro Halifax | Military | History of the Canadian Forces Maritime Command |
| Maritime Museum of the Atlantic | Nova Scotia | Halifax | Halifax Regional Municipality Metro Halifax | Maritime | Includes small craft and the CSS Acadia, a 180-foot steam-powered hydrographic survey ship launched in 1913, part of the Nova Scotia Museum |
| Nova Scotia Highlanders Regimental Museum | Nova Scotia | Amherst | Cumberland Northumberland Shore | Military | website, history of The Nova Scotia Highlanders |
| Pictou County Military Heritage Museum | Nova Scotia | New Glasgow | Pictou Northumberland Shore | Military | information, area's military past |
| Royal Canadian Legion Military Museum | Nova Scotia | Dartmouth | Halifax Regional Municipality Metro Halifax | Military | information |
| Western Counties Military Museum | Nova Scotia | Barrington | Shelburne South Shore | Military | website, operated by the Cape Sable Historical Society |
| 48th Highlanders Museum | Ontario | Toronto | Golden Horseshoe | Military | History of the 48th Highlanders of Canada |
| Base Borden Military Museum | Ontario | Borden | Simcoe County Central | Military | History of CFB Borden, includes planes, tanks, uniforms, weapons |
| Bunker Military Museum | Ontario | Cobalt | Northeastern | Military | website, information, includes artifacts from the Boer War to the present day |
| Campbellford Memorial Military Museum | Ontario | Campbellford | Northumberland Central | Military | information, information |
| Canada Aviation Museum | Ontario | Ottawa | Eastern | Aerospace | History of Canadian aviation, includes civilian and military aircraft |
| Canadian Forces Museum of Aerospace Defense | Ontario | North Bay | Northeastern | Military | website, evolution of air defence and the contributions Canadians have made, includes NORAD exhibit, located at CFB North Bay |
| Canadian Military Heritage Museum | Ontario | Brantford | Golden Horseshoe | Military | website, includes weapons, uniforms, medals, models, artifacts |
| Canadian War Museum | Ontario | Ottawa | Eastern | Military | Canada's military history, includes vehicles, weapons, uniforms, art, artillery, memorabilia |
| Canadian Warplane Heritage Museum | Ontario | Hamilton | Golden Horseshoe | Aerospace | Military aircraft |
| CFB Petawawa Military Museums | Ontario | Petawawa | Eastern | Military | website, complex includes the Canadian Airborne Forces Museum about the history of The Canadian Airborne Regiment, and the CFB Petawawa Military Museum with exhibits about the history of CFB Petawawa |
| Diefenbunker Museum | Ontario | Carp | Eastern | Military | Cold War bunker for the Canadian government |
| Dundurn Castle | Ontario | Hamilton | Golden Horseshoe | Historic house | 40-room 19th-century estate of Sir Allan Napier MacNab, one of Canada's first premiers; grounds include Hamilton Military Museum |
| Elgin Military Museum | Ontario | St. Thomas | Elgin County Southwestern | Military | Canadian military history of Elgin County and its residents |
| First Hussars Museum | Ontario | London | Middlesex Southwestern | Military | website, artifacts and memorabilia of the 1st Hussars, open by appointment |
| Fort Erie | Ontario | Fort Erie | Golden Horseshoe | Military | Restored War of 1812 period fort |
| Fort George National Historic Site | Ontario | Niagara-on-the-Lake | Golden Horseshoe | Military | Restored War of 1812 period fort with living history demonstrations |
| Fort Henry National Historic Site | Ontario | Kingston | Eastern | Military | 19th-century British military fortress with costumed interpreters |
| Fort Malden National Historic Site | Ontario | Amherstburg | Essex Southwestern | Military | Restored fort buildings and exhibits about the War of 1812, the Rebellion of 1837 and 19th-century soldiers' lives |
| Fort St. Joseph National Historic Site | Ontario | St. Joseph Island | Northern | Military | Ruins of War of 1812 fort, exhibits about the site's military history |
| Fort Wellington National Historic Site | Ontario | Prescott | Eastern | Military | Restored 1846 period fort with living history demonstrators |
| Fort York | Ontario | Toronto | Golden Horseshoe | Military | War of 1812 buildings, exhibits and historical re-enactments |
| Georgina Military Museum | Ontario | Keswick | York Region Golden Horseshoe | Military | website |
| Governor General's Foot Guards Regimental Museum | Ontario | Ottawa | Eastern | Military | History of the regiment |
| Great War Flying Museum | Ontario | Brampton | Golden Horseshoe | Aviation | Features flying replicas of World War I aircraft |
| HMCS Haida National Historic Site | Ontario | Hamilton | Golden Horseshoe | Maritime | Tribal-class destroyer museum ship |
| Jet Aircraft Museum | Ontario | London | Middlesex Southwestern | Aviation | Focus is Canadian Forces jet aircraft |
| Military Communications and Electronics Museum | Ontario | Kingston | Eastern | Military | website, history of military communications |
| Royal Canadian Electrical and Mechanical Engineers Museum | Ontario | Kingston | Eastern | Military | website, history of the Corps of RCEME |
| Murney Tower | Ontario | Kingston | Eastern | Military | mid-19th-century martello tower with period exhibits |
| National Air Force Museum of Canada | Ontario | Trenton | Golden Horseshoe | Aviation | Formerly known as the RCAF Memorial Museum, Royal Canadian Air Force aircraft and artifacts |
| No. 6 RCAF Dunnville Museum | Ontario | Dunnville | Golden Horseshoe | Aviation | website, history of the No.6 Service Flying Training School in WW II |
| Ontario Regiment Museum | Ontario | Oshawa | Durham Region Central | Military | History of The Ontario Regiment (RCAC), includes uniforms, over 80 military vehicles, medals, arms, photographs |
| Oshawa Military and Industrial Museum | Ontario | Oshawa | Durham Region Central | Military | Features large collection of military vehicles |
| Perth Legion Hall of Remembrance | Ontario | Perth | Eastern | Military | information |
| Princess of Wales' Own Regiment Museum | Ontario | Kingston | Eastern | Military | information, museum about The Princess of Wales' Own Regiment |
| Queen's Own Rifles of Canada Regimental Museum | Ontario | Toronto | Golden Horseshoe | Military | History of The Queen's Own Rifles of Canada, located on the third floor of Casa Loma |
| Royal Canadian Legion Branch 72 Museum | Ontario | Pembroke | Eastern | Military | website, information, open by request and for special events, local branch of the Royal Canadian Legion |
| Royal Canadian Military Institute Museum | Ontario | Toronto | Golden Horseshoe | Military | Includes guns, swords, spears, other weapons from around the world, badges, uniforms, medals, art, miniatures, photographs and other military memorabilia |
| Royal Canadian Regiment Museum | Ontario | London | Middlesex Southwestern | Military | Regimental history and artifacts |
| Royal Hamilton Light Infantry Heritage Museum | Ontario | Hamilton | Golden Horseshoe | Military | website, history of The Royal Hamilton Light Infantry (Wentworth Regiment), open by appointment |
| Royal Military College of Canada Museum | Ontario | Kingston | Eastern | Military | Located in Fort Frederick, history of the college and the naval history of the site |
| Royal Regiment of Canada Museum | Ontario | Toronto | Golden Horseshoe | Military | History of The Royal Regiment of Canada |
| Secrets of Radar Museum | Ontario | London | Middlesex Southwestern | Military | Story of the more than 6,000 Canadian World War II veterans who were recruited into a top-secret project during World War II involving radar |
| Swords and Ploughshares Museum | Ontario | Kars | Eastern | Military | Focus is the Citizen Soldier (the Militiaman and Reservist) at peace and at war, features many military trucks and vehicles |
| Thunder Bay Military Museum | Ontario | Thunder Bay | Northwestern | Military | website, information, area's military history, includes regimental memorabilia of The Lake Superior Scottish Regiment |
| Toronto Scottish Regiment Museum | Ontario | Toronto | Golden Horseshoe | Military | History of The Toronto Scottish Regiment (Queen Elizabeth The Queen Mother's Own) |
| Kensington Veterans Memorial Museum | Prince Edward Island | Kensington | Prince | Military | website, adjacent to the Royal Canadian Legion, includes uniforms, medals, hand weapons, flags, photographs and maps |
| Prince Edward Island Regimental Museum | Prince Edward Island | Charlottetown | Queens | Military | information |
| Artillery Park Heritage Site | Quebec | Quebec City | Capitale-Nationale | Military | website, 1830s fort |
| Battle of Restigouche National Historic Site | Quebec | Pointe-à-la-Croix | Gaspésie–Îles-de-la-Madeleine | Military | History and artifacts from the site of a 1760 naval battle |
| Battle of the Châteauguay National Historic Site | Quebec | Howick | Montérégie | Military | website, exhibits and site of the 1812 Battle of the Châteauguay |
| Bay Chaleur Military Museum | Quebec | New Richmond | Gaspésie–Îles-de-la-Madeleine | Military | website, contributions of Gaspesians in the major conflicts of the 20th century, impact on the community |
| Black Watch (Royal Highland Regiment) of Canada Museum | Quebec | Montreal | Montreal region | Military | Regimental history and memorabilia |
| Blockhaus de la rivière-Lacolle | Quebec | Saint-Paul-de-l'Île-aux-Noix | Montérégie | Military | information, information, restored 1871 military blockhouse |
| Citadelle of Quebec | Quebec | Quebec City | Capitale-Nationale | Military | Tours include the history of the military garrison, the Royal 22^{e} Régiment Museum, and a former military prison |
| Coteau-du-Lac National Historic Site | Quebec | Coteau-du-Lac | Montérégie | Multiple | website, river transportation by portage and then canal, military blockhouse |
| Discovery Pavilion of the Plains of Abraham | Quebec | Quebec City | Capitale-Nationale | History | website, history of Quebec and military activities at the Plains of Abraham |
| David M. Stewart Museum | Quebec | Montreal | Montreal region | Military | History and military life in New France |
| Fort Chambly National Historic Site | Quebec | Delson | Montérégie | Military | Historic French then British fort, exhibits on New France |
| Fort-de-la-Martinière | Quebec | Lévis | Chaudière-Appalaches | Multiple | information, 20th-century fort with military, local history and art exhibits |
| Fort Lennox National Historic Site | Quebec | Île aux Noix | Montérégie | Military | Reconstructed 1820s fort |
| Fort Ingall | Quebec | Cabano | Bas-Saint-Laurent | Military | Reconstructed 19th-century fort |
| Fortifications of Quebec National Historic Site | Quebec | Quebec City | Capitale-Nationale | Military | website, history and guided tours of the city's different fortification projects and defense strategies |
| Lévis Forts National Historic Site | Quebec | Lévis | Chaudière-Appalaches | Military | Mid-19th-century British fort with exhibits |
| Martello Tower 1 | Quebec | Quebec City | Capitale-Nationale | Military | Early 19th-century soldier's life, military history of the Plains of Abraham |
| Montreal Holocaust Memorial Centre | Quebec | Montreal | Montreal region | History | Holocaust story and effects of bigotry and hate |
| Musée de la Défense aérienne Bagotville Air Defence Museum | Quebec | Bagotville | Saguenay–Lac-Saint-Jean | Aviation | website, history of military aviation, including CFB Bagotville |
| Musée du Fort | Quebec | Quebec City | Capitale-Nationale | Military | website, military history of Quebec City |
| Musée du Fort Saint-Jean | Quebec | Saint-Jean-sur-Richelieu | Montérégie | Military | History and artifacts of the 17th-century French fort and the Collège militaire royal de Saint-Jean |
| Musée du Régiment de la Chaudière | Quebec | Lévis | Chaudière-Appalaches | Military | information, WW II Le Régiment de la Chaudière |
| Naval Museum of Quebec | Quebec | Quebec City | Capitale-Nationale | Maritime | website |
| Royal Canadian Ordnance Corps Museum | Quebec | Montreal | Montreal region | Military | website, regimental history and memorabilia, located in the garrison in Longue-Pointe |
| Royal Montreal Regiment Museum | Quebec | Montreal | Montreal region | Military | website, regimental history and memorabilia of The Royal Montreal Regiment |
| Vintage Wings of Canada | Quebec | Gatineau | Outaouais | Aviation | Early history of powered flight, classic aircraft |
| Bill Benson Military Museum | Saskatchewan | Humboldt | East Central | Military | information |
| Fort Walsh | Quebec | Maple Creek | Southwest | Military | Restored 19th-century fort and townsite |
| Royal Canadian Legion Museum | Saskatchewan | Saskatoon | West Central | Military | website, uniforms, medals and memorabilia of the Royal Canadian Legion |
| Saskatchewan Military Museum | Saskatchewan | Regina | Southeast | Military | websiteinformation |

== See also ==
- List of Canadian military operations
- Canadian Forces
- History of the Canadian Army
- History of Canada
- Military history
- Colonial militia in Canada
- List of Canadian Victoria Cross recipients
- Canada and the American Civil War
- Canada and the Vietnam War
- Mackenzie-Papineau Battalion - Canada and the Spanish Civil War
- Canada and NATO
- Canada and the United Nations
- Virtual Museum of Canada
