= 42 Radar Squadron =

- 42^{e} Escadron de radar
- Active: June 1955–present
- Country: Canada
- Branch: Royal Canadian Air Force
- Type: Tactical fighter control
- Size: Squadron
- Part of: 4 Wing Cold Lake
- Garrison/HQ: CFB Cold Lake
- Motto: Dirigenti manu (Latin for 'with a guiding hand')
- Equipment: AN/TPS-77 Radar system
- Website: canada.ca/en/air-force/corporate/squadrons/42-squadron.html

42 Radar Squadron (French: 42^{e} Escadron de radar) is a unit of the Canadian Forces under the Royal Canadian Air Force. The squadron operates the AN/TPS-77 radar system from CFB Cold Lake in Alberta, Canada.

== History ==
42 Aircraft Control and Warning (AC&W) Squadron of the Royal Canadian Air Force became operational in June 1955. The squadron was originally tasked with providing radar control to the CF-100s flying in the vicinity of RCAF Station Cold Lake. In October 1962, 42 AC&W Squadron as 42 Radar Squadron became part of the Semi-Automated Ground Environment (SAGE) system, as part of the 28th NORAD Region.
