= National Air Force Museum of Canada =

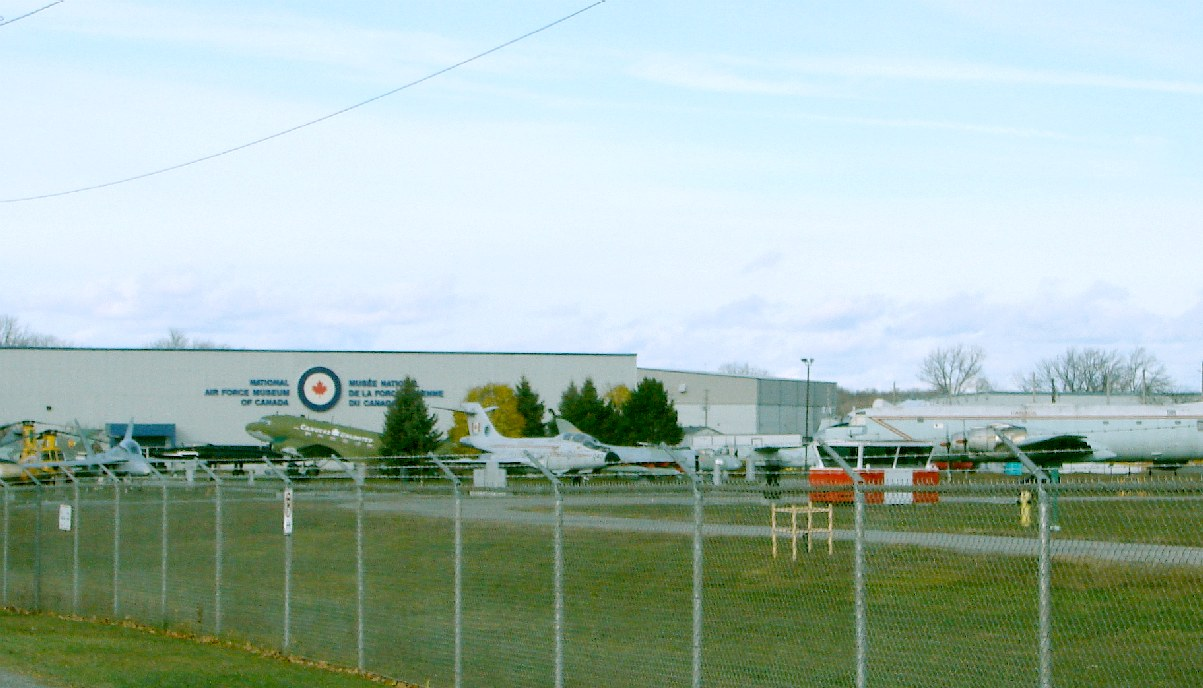

- Location within Ontario
- Former name: RCAF Memorial Library and Museum; Air Force National Museum
- Established: 1984
- Location: CFB Trenton in Trenton, Ontario
- Coordinates: 44°6′56.36″N 77°33′2.37″W
- Type: Aviation museum
- Website: www.airforcemuseum.ca

The National Air Force Museum of Canada is an aviation museum dedicated to preserving the history of the Royal Canadian Air Force (RCAF) and is located on the west side of CFB Trenton in Trenton, Ontario.

The museum is a permanent archive which collects, preserves and displays Royal Canadian Air Force (RCAF) memorabilia, photographs, paintings and documents as a lasting tribute and memorial to all the men and women who served in the RCAF and its predecessor organizations.

== History ==
The RCAF Memorial Library and Museum opened on 1 April 1984 – the 60th anniversary of the establishment of the Royal Canadian Air Force – in the CFB Trenton Recreation Center. However, the museum quickly outgrew the location and moved to the base's former curling club exactly 10 years later in 1994. With the acquisition of a Handley Page Halifax restoration project in 1995, the museum was again short on space. So from 2004 to 2005 the museum constructed a purpose built Main Exhibition Hall. This was not before the name of the museum was changed to the Air Force National Museum in 1998. Ten years later, it was changed again to the National Air Force Museum of Canada.

Between November 2012 and August 2013, a second phase of construction was completed on the main exhibition hall. This involved adding additional staircases between the two floors of the building and finishing various rooms.

The RCAF salvaged avionics from the museum's C-130 to use on an active duty aircraft in 2014.

In 2016, the museum acquired an Avro Lancaster that had been on display in Edmundston, New Brunswick. Chris Colton, the executive director of the museum for 21 years, retired in June 2018. Later that year, the museum acquired a CP-140 Aurora.

== Collection ==
=== Aircraft on display ===
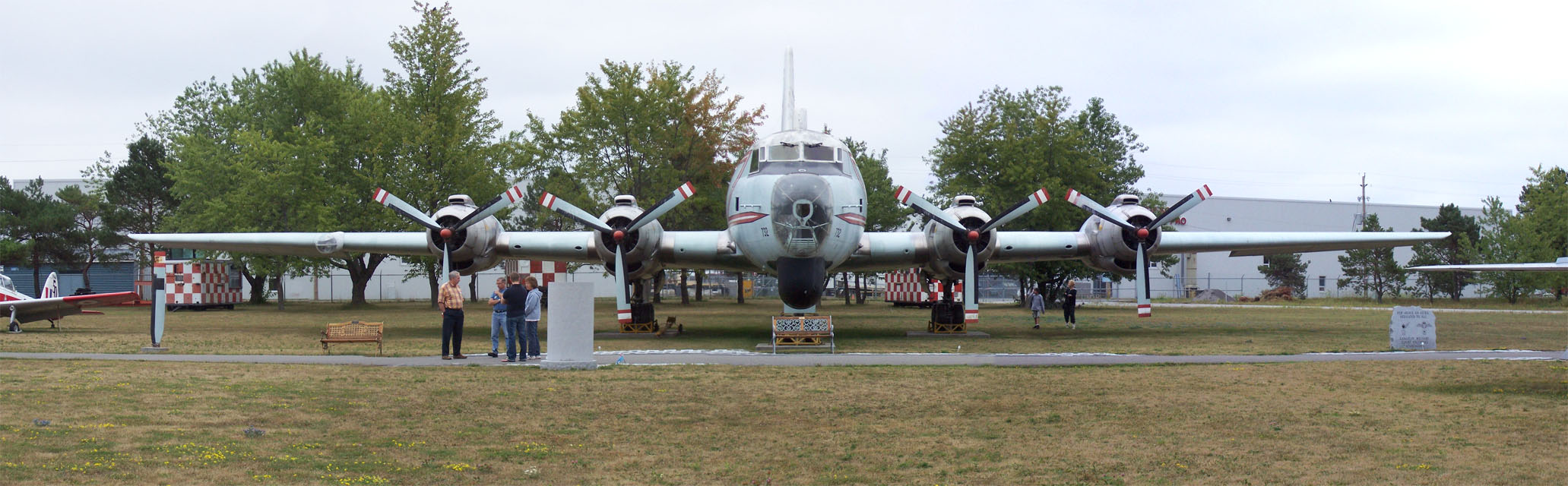
Canadair CP-107 Argus

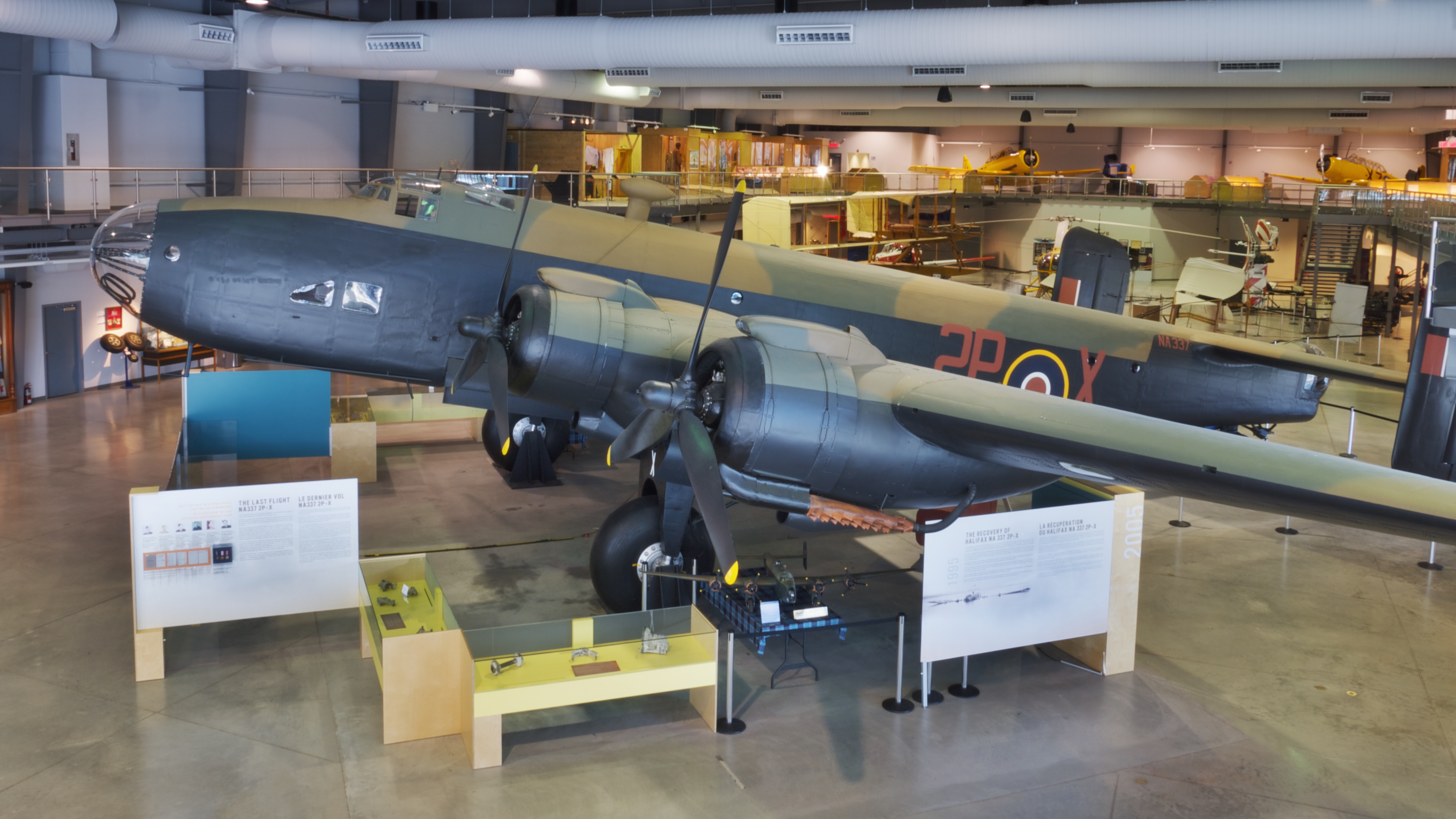
Handley Page Halifax A.VII

- AEA Silver Dart – replica
- Airbus CC-150 Polaris 15001
- Auster AOP.6
- Avro Anson
- Avro Canada CF-100 Canuck 18774
- Beechcraft CT-134 Musketeer 134201
- Bell CH-118 Iroquois 118101
- Bell CH-135 Twin Huey 135102
- Bell CH-136 Kiowa 136204
- Boeing CH-47D Chinook 147201
- Boeing Vertol CH-113 Labrador 11315
- Boeing 720 18024
- Bombardier CC-144 Challenger 144601
- Burgess-Dunne – replica
- Canadair CF-5 Freedom Fighter 11672
- Canadair CF-104 Starfighter 104646
- Canadair CP-107 Argus 10732
- Canadair CT-114 Tutor 114015
- Canadair CT-133 Silver Star 21435
- Canadair CT-133 Silver Star 133593 – cutaway
- Canadair Sabre V 23257
- de Havilland Canada Chipmunk T.10 WB550
- de Havilland Canada CP-121 Tracker 1545
- Douglas CC-129 Dakota 12963
- Handley Page Halifax A.VII NA337
- Hawker Hunter F.58 J-4029
- Hawker Hurricane II V7287 – replica
- Lockheed CC-130E Hercules 130313
- Lockheed CP-140 Aurora 140102
- McDonnell CF-101 Voodoo 101040
- McDonnell Douglas CF-18 Hornet 188911
- Mikoyan-Gurevich MiG-21MF 23+45
- North American Harvard II 3270
- North American Yale 3411
- SAGEM Sperwer 161007
- Sikorsky Dragonfly 9601
- Supermarine Spitfire IX ML380 – replica

=== Under restoration ===
- Avro Lancaster B.X KB882
- Lockheed Hudson VI FK466

== Memorials ==
There are 29 memorials and cairns dedicated to RCAF squadrons and units:

- No. 6 Group RCAF
- No. 6 Repair Depot
- 306 Maple Leaf Wing RCAFA
- 405 Squadron
- 407 Demon Squadron
- 408 Squadron
- 413 Squadron
- 424 Squadron
- 426 Squadron
- 429 Squadron
- 431 Squadron
- 434 Squadron
- 435 Squadron
- 436 Squadron
- 437 Squadron
- 438 Squadron
- AWFP Association
- Burma Bomber Association
- Canadian Military Flight Engineers Association
- Dodo Birds – ex RCAF Flight Sergeants
- Jewish Memorial
- Loadmaster Memorial
- Mobile Support Equipment
- Non-Destructive Testing
- Para Rescue Association of Canada
- RCAF and Allied Forces Bomber Command
- RCAF Fighter Pilots Association
- RCAF Meteorologists
- RCAF Police
- Sabre Pilots I Air Division
- Workshop Machinists

== Affiliations ==
The museum is affiliated with: CMA, CHIN, OMMC and Virtual Museum of Canada.

== See also ==
- List of aviation museums
- National Museum of the United States Air Force
- Organization of Military Museums of Canada
