= Canadian Museums Association =

Canadian non-profit organization

Coordinates: 45°24′57″N 75°41′29″W

Canadian Museums Association Association des musées canadiens
- Abbreviation: CMA
- Formation: 1947
- Type: Non-profit association
- Legal status: Active
- Purpose: The advancement of the Canadian museum sector
- Headquarters: Ottawa, Ontario Canada
- Location: Ottawa, Ont.
- Region served: National
- Members: 2000 organizations
- Official language: English & French
- Affiliations: CHIN, OMMC and VMC.
- Staff: 20–25
- Website: museums.ca

The Canadian Museums Association (CMA; French: Association des musées canadiens, AMC), is a national non-profit organization for the promotion of museums in Canada. It represents Canadian museum professionals both within Canada and internationally. As with most trade associations, it aims to improve the recognition, growth and stability of its constituency. Its staff supports their nearly 2,000 members with conferences, publications, and networking opportunities.

CMA members include national museums, non-profit museums, art galleries, science centres, aquariums, archives, sport halls-of-fame, artist-run centres, zoos and historic sites across Canada. They range from large metropolitan galleries to small community museums. All are dedicated to preserving and presenting Canada's cultural heritage to the public.

== History ==
In 1932, British Museums Association President Sir Henry Miers visited museums in Canada and found them "in a deplorable state and far behind those of the United States and most European countries." According to notes later left in CMA bylaws, the intention had been to form an association in the 1930s, but this was delayed because of the Second World War.

Following the war, the idea for an association began to gain popularity. In a 1946 letter to Alice Johannsen Turham of the McGill University Museums, Harry O. McCurry of the National Gallery of Canada explained:

As you know I have always felt that a Canadian Museums Association is essential to the proper development of a Canadian museum service and I hope you feel the same way. I was astonished to hear from one prominent curator, that he thought we ought not to form an association of our own but to link up with the U.S.A. I am all for most cordial cooperation with the American Museums Association in every way but we need an organization of our own to deal with problems which are particularly Canadian.

A small group of representatives from 13 museums met in Quebec City, QC, during the 42nd Annual Meeting of the American Association of Museums (now the American Alliance of Museums). It was granted a charter by the Secretary of State on 10 September 1947.

Founding members and their institutions (at the time):

- F.J. Alcock (National Museum of Canada)
- E.C. Cross (Royal Ontario Museum)
- R.E. Crouch (London Public Library and Art Museum)
- Donald K. Crowdis (Provincial Museum of Nova Scotia)
- J.R. Dymond (Royal Ontario Museum of Zoology)
- W.B. Hurd (McMaster University)
- Dr. T.F. McIlwraith (Royal Ontario Museum of Archaeology)
- Elsie M. Murray (Museum of Indian Archaeology, University of Western Ontario)
- H.O. McCurry (National Gallery of Canada)
- Paul Rainville (Musée de la Province de Québec)
- Dr. E.S. Moore (Royal Ontario Museum of Geology and Mineralogy)
- W.A. Squires (New Brunswick Museum)
- Alice Johannsen Turnham (McGill University Museums)

In addition to the above, eight more observers were present at the founding event and are recognized as founding members (as opposed to delegates).

The 1988 controversy surrounding The Spirit Sings exhibition at the Glenbow Museum led to the creation of a task force to assess and address issues of Indigenous involvement in museums, access to museum collections and the interpretation of artifacts and human remains. In 1992, CMA, in partnership with the Assembly of First Nations, published the report Turning The Page with recommendations on repatriation of human remains and sacred objects to indigenous communities.

In 2015, CMA was named in Calls to Action 67 and 68 of the Truth and Reconciliation Commission to undertake special roles in the reconciliation process.

- Call to Action #67 states: We call upon the federal government to provide funding to the Canadian Museums Association to undertake, in collaboration with Aboriginal peoples, a national review of museum policies and best practices to determine the level of compliance with the United Nations Declaration on the Rights of Indigenous Peoples (UNDRIP) and to make recommendations.
- Call to Action #68 states: We call upon the federal government, in collaboration with Aboriginal peoples, and the Canadian Museums Association to mark the 150th anniversary of Canadian Confederation in 2017 by establishing a dedicated national funding program for commemoration projects on the theme of reconciliation.

In 2018, the Department of Canadian Heritage granted the CMA $680,948 to produce a report and recommendations on the implementation of UNDRIP within Canadian museums. The CMA published its report, Moved to Action: Activating UNDRIP in Canadian Museums, in 2022.

== Mandate ==
The CMA is a federally incorporated nonprofit association which advances public museum services in Canada, promotes the welfare and a better administration of museums and fosters a continuing improvement in the qualifications and practices of museum professionals. It is a registered charity, and administers the funds of the former Museums Foundation of Canada, a separate charity that wrapped up in 2020.

== Governing structure ==
The CMA is governed by an elected Board of Directors and maintains a full-service Secretariat in Ottawa.

Since its founding, CMA has had thirteen executive directors:

- Archie Key (1965–1967)
- N. George Shaw (1968–1969)
- S. James Gooding (acting; 1969)
- William Scott Bragg (1969–1971)
- Don Smithies (1971–1974)
- Archie Key (interim; 1974)
- Robin Inglis (1974–1979)
- Lynn Ogden (1979–1981)
- John McAvity (1981–2018)
- Vanda Vitali (2019–2021)
- Massimo Bergamini (interim; 2021–2022)
- Janis Kahentóktha Bomberry (2023–2026)
- Lauren Wheeler (2026- )

== Services ==
CMA publishes its bilingual bimonthly Muse magazine and offers its members services such as advocacy on broad public policy, an insurance program and awards, among other services. The association regularly appears before parliamentary committees on issues of heritage. CMA also hosts Canadian Museums Day on Parliament Hill to celebrate the contributions of museums to society.

Since 1996, the association administers for the Department of Canadian Heritage the Young Canada Works program which provides funds for the hiring of summer students and interns in museums in order for them to obtain experience in the heritage field.

It also offers large national conferences each year in various locations across Canada (Ottawa 2017 and Vancouver 2018) as well as specialized conferences on museum issues, such as Museum Traveling Exhibitions, Deaccessioning Standards, Art and Law symposium, Museum Enterprises Conference, Future of Exhibition Design Symposium, etc.

== Partnerships ==
The CMA has both formal and informal partnerships with organizations relating to arts and heritage across the country. Formal partnerships, including administrative support, include ICOM Canada, Canadian Art Museum Directors Organization and the Canadian Federation of Friends of Museums.

Informal partnerships include the Provincial and Territorial Museum Associations across Canada.
