= Canadian Heritage Information Network =

Agency of the federal Department of Canadian Heritage

- Réseau canadien d'information sur le patrimoine
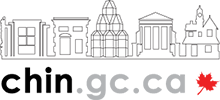

Agency overview
- Preceding agency: National Inventory Programme
- Type: Special operating agency
- Headquarters: 1030 Innes Road; Ottawa, Ontario
- Annual budget: $2.76 m CAD (2017-18)
- Agency executive: Jérôme Moisan, Director General of Heritage Group
- Parent department: Department of Canadian Heritage
- Website: canada.ca/en/heritage-information-network.html

The Canadian Heritage Information Network (CHIN; French: Réseau canadien d'information sur le patrimoine, RCIP) is a special operating agency within the federal Department of Canadian Heritage that provides a networked interface to Canada's heritage institutions. It is based in Gatineau, Quebec, and is administratively merged with the Canadian Conservation Institute (CCI), another special operating agency of Canadian Heritage.

Along with providing online public access to millions of collections records, CHIN offers collections management resources to Canada's museum community; more specifically, it assists museums in documenting, managing, and sharing information about their collections, thereby ensuring the accessibility of such information. CHIN provides bilingual information for all its resources.

CHIN has three core areas of activity:

1. create and maintain an online point of entry to Canadian collections;
2. carry out research and development on collections documentation tools and standards; and
3. provide guidance and training to cultural institutions on managing collections information.

CHIN was the first national organization to participate in the Virtual Library museums pages (VLmp) online museums directory, later supported by ICOM.

Moreover, the agency oversees Artefacts Canada, a national inventory of museum collections that provides access to several million records and images from Canadian museums. It used by national and international heritage professionals—as well as by the public—to research Canadian cultural collections. CHIN also manages the online database for Rowman & Littlefield's Nomenclature for Museum Cataloging, a structured and controlled list of object terms organized in a classification system in order to "provide a basis for indexing and cataloging collections of human-made objects." First published in 1978 (launching online in 2018), it is North America's most extensively used "museum classification and controlled vocabulary for historical and ethnological collections."

== History ==
The Canadian Heritage Information Network was established in 1972 as Canada's National Inventory Programme, originally to create a data bank, accessed through a computerized national network, and to help museums construct computerized inventories of their collections.

In the 1990s, CHIN began maintaining a website where the museum community of Canada could find resources to improve the online visibility of their collections.

In the 2010s, Rowman & Littlefield agreed to allow CHIN to create an online version to supplement the published version of Nomenclature for Museum Cataloging 4.0. The site was launched in 2018.

== See also ==
- Virtual Museum of Canada
