= Digital Museums Canada =

Museum and heritage organization funding program

- Former name: Virtual Museum of Canada
- Established: 2001 (as Virtual Museum of Canada); 2021 (as Digital Museums Canada)
- Type: Funding program
- Director: Leah Resnick
- Owner: Canadian Museum of History
- Website: www.digitalmuseums.ca

Canadian Museum of History network
- Canadian Museum of History; Canadian War Museum; Virtual Museum of New France

Digital Museums Canada (DMC; French: Musées numériques Canada, MNC) is a funding program in Canada "dedicated to online projects by the museum and heritage community," helping organizations to build digital capacity.

Administered by the Canadian Museum of History (CMH) with the financial support of the Government of Canada, DMC provides investments of CA$15,000 to $250,000 for audience-engaging online projects by Canadian museums and heritage organizations.

== History ==
The Digital Museum of Canada was preceded by the Virtual Museum of Canada (VMC), which existed from 2001 to 2021. The VMC was launched by the Canadian Heritage Information Network (CHIN) of the Department of Canadian Heritage as a major collaborative online initiative to allow Canadian museums and heritage organizations to connect with online visitors.

In February 2014, the Government of Canada announced its intention to transfer the VMC and the Online Works of Reference to the Canadian Museum of History (CMH). Bill C-31, an Act to implement certain provisions of the budget and other measures, soon after received royal assent confirming that the CMH would assume responsibility for these two programs.

The VMC grew to include virtual exhibits, educational resources for teachers (in both French and English), and over 900,000 images. Additionally, the VMC Investment Program was created to invest in Canadian museums to create online exhibitions. The Virtual Exhibits Investment Program was geared to medium- to large-sized institutions. The other offerings were the Community Memories Program, an investment program designed for smaller Canadian community museums, to allow them to create online exhibits about their history.

In 2020, the Digital Museum of Canada was created as a successor to the VMC with a focus on investing in online projects by Canadian museums and heritage organizations rather than offering a public facing online portal like the VMC. Following this new mandate, in 2021, with a directory of over 3,000 Canadian heritage institutions and a database of over 600 virtual exhibits, the VMC website was scheduled to discontinue hosting exhibits on 30 June 2021.
