= Canadair CF-5 =

Canadian fighter aircraft introduced 1968

CF-5/CF-116/NF-5 Freedom Fighter
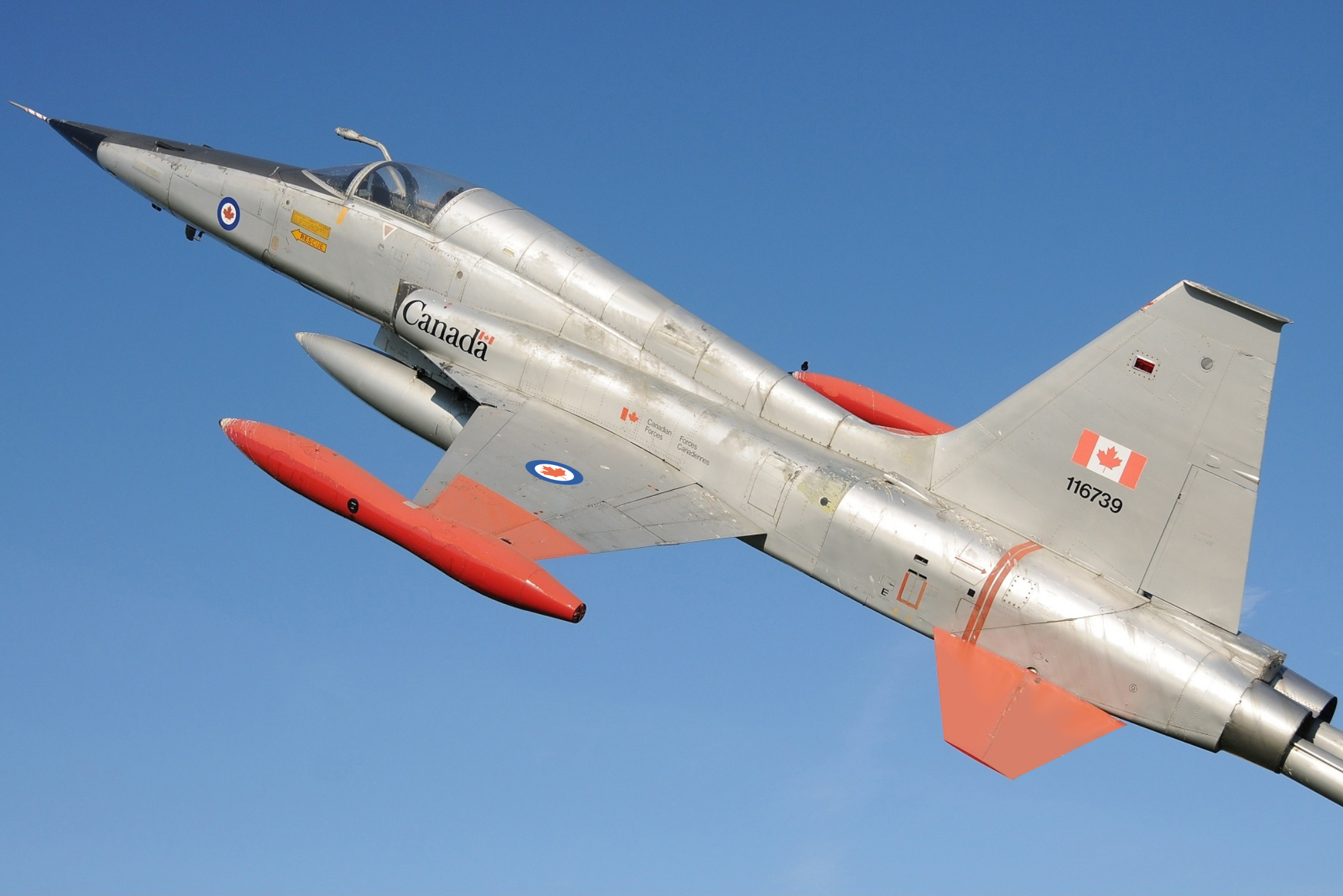
- Canadian Forces CF-5A Freedom Fighter on display at Trenton, Ontario

General information
- Type: Fighter-bomber
- Manufacturer: Canadair
- Status: Retired from Canadian service in 1995, still in service with some countries
- Primary users: Canadian Forces (former) Royal Netherlands Air Force; Venezuelan Air Force; Turkish Air Force
- Number built: 240

History
- Introduction date: 5 November 1968
- First flight: 6 May 1968
- Developed from: Northrop F-5

The Canadair CF-5 (officially designated the CF-116 Freedom Fighter) is a Canadian license-built localised model of the Northrop F-5 Freedom Fighter. It is a light, supersonic, twin engine, daylight air superiority fighter primarily for the Canadian Forces (as the CF-5) and the Royal Netherlands Air Force (as the NF-5).

The CF-5 was procured as a replacement for the CF-104 Starfighter and CF-101 Voodoo via a selection process conducted in the mid 1960s, during which the Defense Minister Paul Hellyer shaped the requirements to favour the CF-5. It was originally ordered for the Royal Canadian Air Force, which was integrated into the newly unifed Canadian Forces on 1 February 1968. As part of the procurement arrangement, the CF-5 was domestically produced by Canadair. These aircraft featured several changes to suit Canadian requirements, these included a two-position nose landing gear (to reduce the takeoff distance required), the addition of an midair refueling probe and upgraded navigation system, and the adoption of an interchangable nose to permit the use of a purpose-build unit with cameras for aerial reconnaissance missions.

At the end of 1968, the Canadian Forces took delivery of its first aircraft (it was almost universally referred to as the CF-5 except in official documentation). Two frontline squadrons and one training squadron were equipped with the type. 89 single-seat aircraft and 46 dual-seat aircraft were produced for the Canadian Forces by Canadair, although the service would not operate them all due to budget constraints. It was envisioned that, in time of war, the CF-5 fleet would be used as a rapid deployment asset. The CF-5 was used to perform various roles, including attack strike fighter, reconnaissance platform and trainer, as well as being upgraded periodically throughout its service life. Canada withdrew the last of its CF-5s in 1995, the type having been replaced in frontline service by the newer McDonnell Douglas CF-18 Hornet.

The Canadian Forces were not the type's sole operator; Canadair produced 75 single-seat aircraft and 30 dual-seat aircraft for the Royal Netherlands Air Force. Introduced in 1969 as a replacement for their Republic F-84 fighters and Lockheed T-33 trainer, the Dutch operated the NF-5 until March 1991, by which point it had been succeeded by the General Dynamics F-16 Fighting Falcon. Surplus aircraft were acquired by both the Turkish Air Force and the Venezuelan Air Force, the latter having used the type in combat on several occasions. It continues to be used by other countries into the twenty-first century.

== Design and development ==
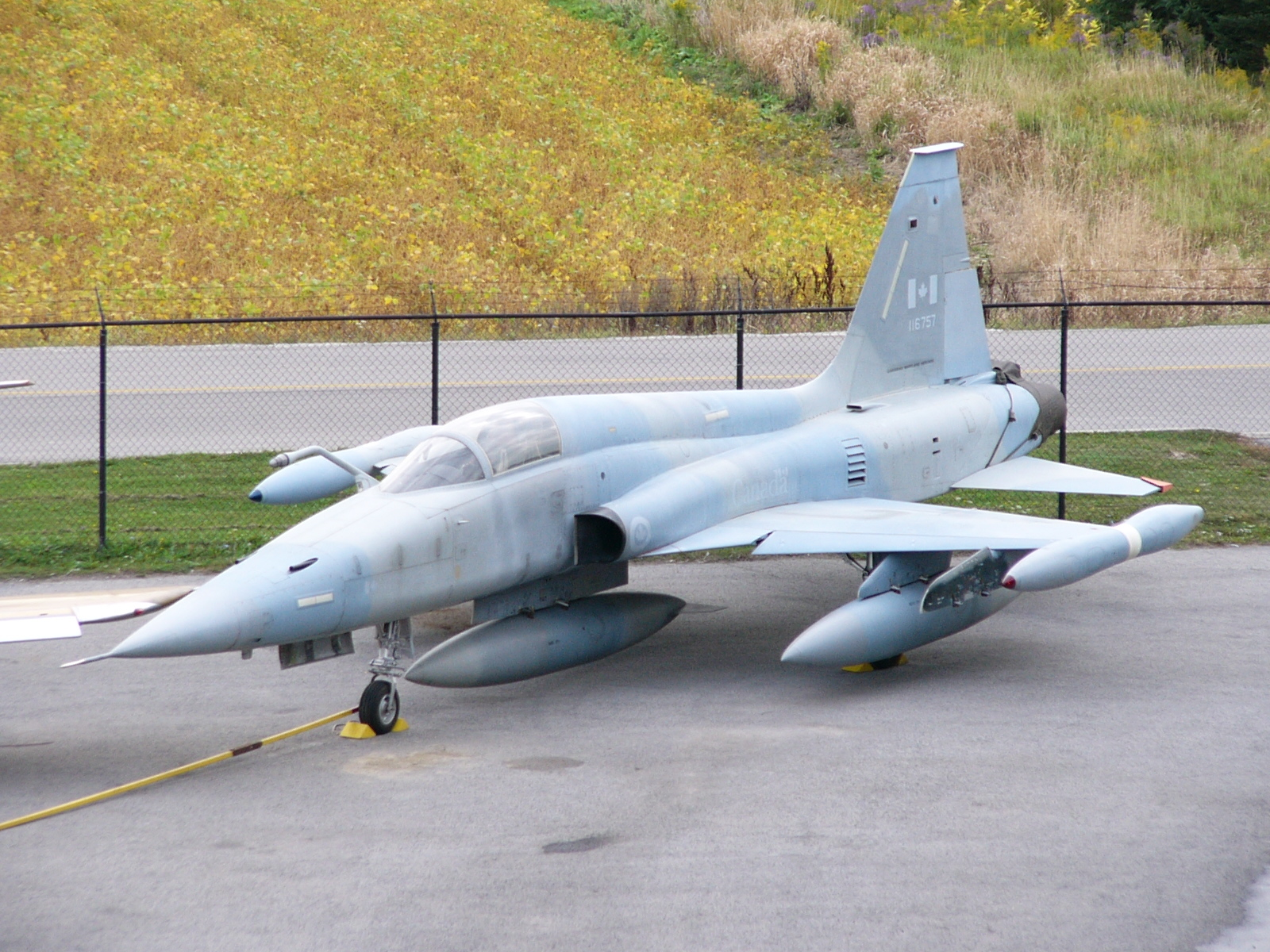
CF-5A at the Canadian Warplane Heritage Museum

Originally designed by Northrop as a low-cost, low-maintenance fighter jet, the F-5 was intended for use by air forces that had limited resources and technical expertise. In 1964, the Royal Canadian Air Force, searching for a replacement for both the conventional attack fighter CF-104 Starfighter and the nuclear strike interceptor CF-101 Voodoo, proposed entering into a joint production agreement with the United Kingdom to build over 100 F-4 Phantom II (which the Royal Navy was eager to acquire) but this was rejected as too costly. In February 1965, Chief of Operational Readiness and a future CDS, Lieutenant-General Jean Victor Allard, evaluated four possible replacements: Northrop F-5, Grumman A-6 Intruder, Douglas A-4 Skyhawk and LTV A-7 Corsair II.

Several officials within the Royal Canadian Navy advocated for the A-4 Skyhawk as a replacement for its carrier based McDonnell F2H Banshee; the only aircraft deemed to be "not suitable" was the F-5, and the A-7 Corsair was recommended. Nonetheless, Defense Minister Paul Hellyer "questioned the RCAF’s preoccupation with fighters generally, and he rejected the need for and the utility of the nuclear strike role specifically" and changed the requirements, thus "guaranteeing that the CF-5 be selected as the new tactical fighter, and that the RCAF was to adopt an affordable aircraft capable of performing a conventional attack role," even though he later wrote in his biography that the F-5 was “little more than a trainer with guns hung on it.” In Canada, which had a mature aerospace industry, selection of the less sophisticated F-5 was a disappointment and "clearly unpopular" among those in the RCAF. Selected to provide a tactical support role, based in Canada but to relocate to Europe, CF-5 squadrons were also committed to NATO's northern flank to act as a rapid-deployment force. However, the role for the CF-5 throughout its service with the RCAF was changed frequently and eventually the diminutive fighter would serve as an attack strike fighter, reconnaissance platform and trainer.

Various modifications were enacted to the base F-5 design in order to adapt the aircraft to fulfil Canadian operational requires and to satisfy Canada’s NATO commitments. To this end, the CF-5 was equipped with in-flight refuelling probe so that it could traverse long distances, including transatlantic flights to and from Europe. It was also powered by Orenda-built General Electric J85-15 engines, producing up to 4,300 lbf (19 kN) of thrust, which considerably excessed the standard F-5's thrust output. Other alterations including the reinforcement of the windshield to better handle bird strikes, the adoption of an improved gun sight, retractable screens on the air intakes, and additional aircraft armour. In order to address concerns over lengthy takeoff runs, the single-seat model of the CF-5 featured a two-position nose landing gear; in compression it operated akin to the original arrangement but, while extended (prior to takeoff), it raised the nose and thereby increased the angle of attack and thus the amount of lift generated. This arrangement reduced the aircraft's required takeoff distance by almost 20 percent. Furthermore, a more sophisticated navigation system was integrated and the aircraft's nose was also interchangeable with a specially designed aerial reconnaissance set with four cameras in it.

Canadair was keen to license-build the F-5 not only for domestic operation but also for the international export market. In early 1967, an order for 105 aircraft for the Royal Netherlands Air Force was signed, comprising 75 single-seaters to replace the Republic F-84 and 30 twin-seaters to replace the Lockheed T-33. The plan to use some single-seaters for photo-reconnaissance to replace the Lockheed F-104G Starfighters never materialized. Production of the F-5 in Europe was originally planned by both Fokker and SABCA, for the Dutch and Belgian Air Forces, but hesitancy by Belgium led to the Netherlands government ordering under a production sharing agreement with Canada instead. As part of the production sharing agreement between the Canadian and Dutch governments, the centre fuselages for all but the first 31 aircraft were built by Fokker in the Netherlands.

In 1967, the Canadian production line for the type, based in Montreal, Quebec, commenced. On 6 February 1968, the first CF-5 was officially rolled out in a ceremony at the Cartierville factory; delivery took place in Nocember of that year. On 5 March 1969, the first NF-5 was rolled out.

Over the course of its life, the CF-5 received many upgrades to its avionics and capabilities.

== Operational history ==
=== Canada ===
CF-5 badge worn by Canadian Forces aircrew and ground crew in the mid-1970s

Initially, 433 Squadron and 434 Squadron were the only two squadrons to operate the CF-5. It had been intended that three squadrons would fly the aircraft however, primarily as a result of budgetary restrictions, this much usage never occurred. Excess aircraft were put into storage in CFB North Bay and CFB Trenton, several of which were later sold to other countries. The CF-5 was unable to realistically intercept Soviet bombers flying over the Arctic due to insufficient endurance and a lack of all-weather performance.

434 Squadron was assigned to perform lead-in tactical fighter training for the Canadair CF-104 Starfighter. It was later transitioned to the role of a rapid reaction squadron, being ready to deploy at short notice in the event of hostilities either to central Europe or Norway. 434 squadron relocated to CFB Bagotville alongside 433 Squadron, but only a short time later was moved to CFB Chatham.

CF-5s did deploy to Europe on numerous occasions during the Cold War: in 1970 six CF-5As deployed to CFB Baden–Soellingen in Germany, later flying to Norway in early 1971; in 1973 eight CF-5A and CF-5R flew to Norway; in 1974 four CF-5A and CF-5Rs participated in a NATO reconnaissance exercise at Leck, Germany; two Canadair CF-5R visited Leeuwarden, Netherlands in 1974; sixteen CF-5As flew to Europe in 1977; in 1978 eight CF-5As deployed to Norway to participate to NATO's Arctic Express exercise; in 1980 eight CF-5As participated in the Anorak Express exercise in Norway; in 1985 and 1986 CF-5As deployed to NATO exercises (Brave Lion) in Norway, and finally, the last deployment to Europe was in 1987 when four CF-5As arrived at CFB Baden–Soellingen; in June 1988, the CF-5A was replaced in the rapid deployment force by the McDonnell Douglas CF-18 Hornet. Additionally, CF-5R photo reconnaissance aircraft participated in Best Focus exercises in Europe during 1978, 1980 and 1985, with a Canadian pilot winning the NATO "Photo Derby" in 1985.

The training role was adopted by 419 Squadron, based at CFB Cold Lake. The CF-5 would continue to provide jet training, dissimilar air combat training (painted in Soviet style "aggressor" schemes), and serve as a lead-in fighter trainer for the McDonnell Douglas CF-18 Hornet until retired in June 1995. All remaining airframes were put into storage at CFD Mountain View while the Canadian government and Bristol Aerospace sought out buyers. A proposed sale to Greece in the early 2000s was ultimately unrealised. Twenty of these surplus aircraft were sold to Venezuela.

=== Netherlands ===
NF-5B in flight, 1979

In October 1969, the Royal Netherlands Air Force took delivery of its first aircraft (an NF-5B twin-seater); the first squadron to be equipped with the type was 313 Squadron at Twente. The initial role of 313 Squadron was a conversion unit to train pilots on the new type. As part of the conversion effort, Dutch pilots often trained in Canada (in CF-5s) and in the United States (in Northrop T-38s).

The NF-5 would serve with four operation squadrons, 313 and 315 Squadron at Twenthe, 316 Squadron at Gilze-Rijen and 314 Squadron at Eindhoven. The final NF-5 delivery took place in March 1972.

Starting in 1986, the squadrons began to convert to the licence-built General Dynamics F-16 Fighting Falcon. The last NF-5 flight occurred on 15 March 1991.

Most of the Dutch aircraft were subsiquently sold to Turkey (numerous aircraft were flown by the Turkish Stars) and Venezuela (mix CF-5A and CF-5D - 18 in 1972, 2 new CF-5D in 1974 and 7 ex-RNAF NF-5A/B in 1990; all served with Grupo de Caza 12) or retained for spares support. A dozen aircraft were donated to Greece.

=== Venezuela ===
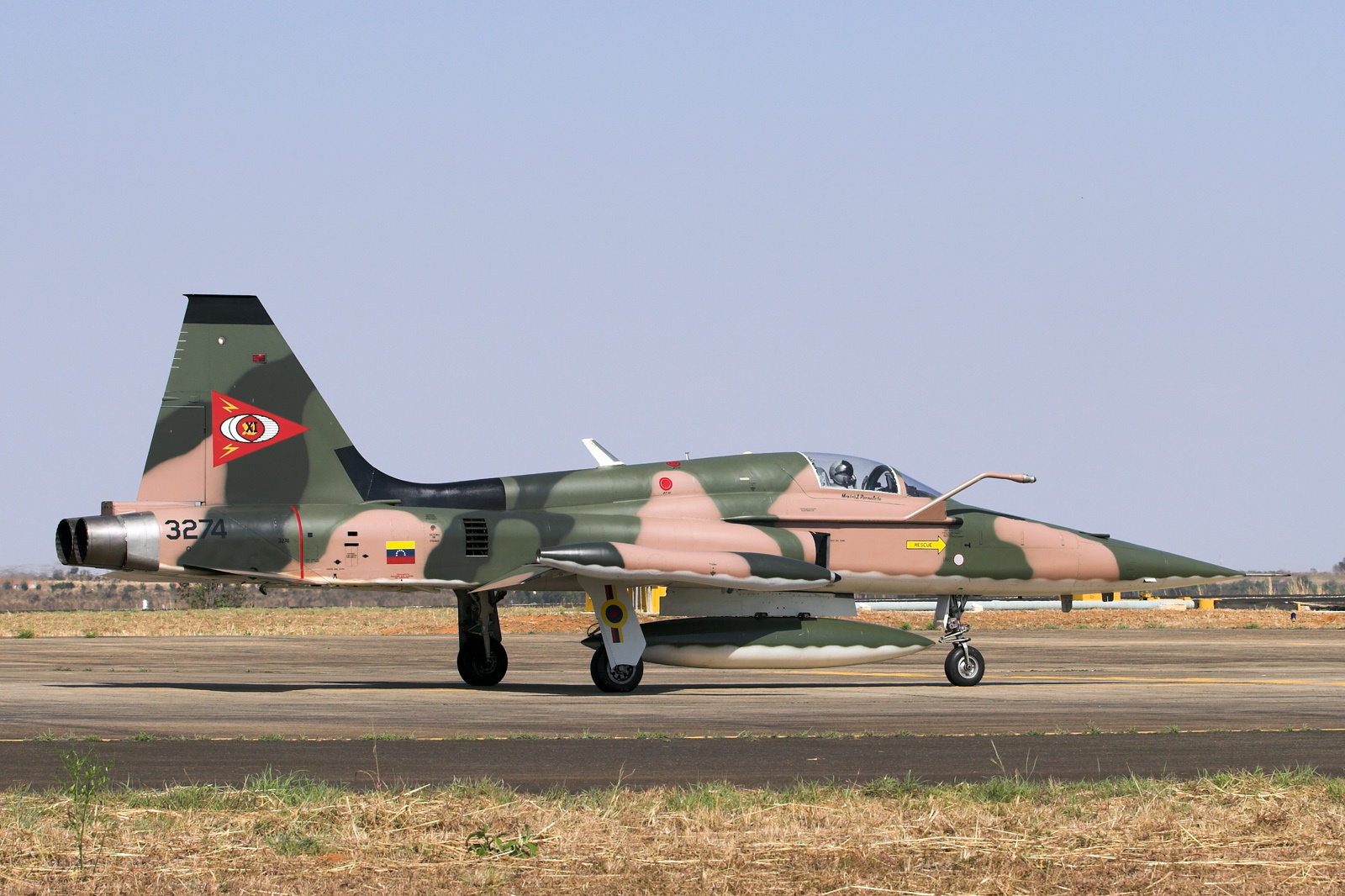
Venezuela Air Force Northrop (Canadair) VF-5A (CL-226)

After a reorganization of the Venezuelan Air Force in the late 1960s, the government realized that it was time to replace its obsolete de Havilland Vampires and Venoms active at that time, as well as the last surviving F-86 Sabres in active duty. In 1971, 54 Canadian-built CF-5As were put in storage, after the RCAF could not take them due to budget cuts. From this batch, Venezuela acquired 16 CF-5As and two CF-5Ds. In 1972, by which point every aircraft had been delivered, the F-86s, Venoms, and Vampires were all finally withdrawn.

The F-5 became the first military plane in Venezuela capable of flying at supersonic speeds. After a legal dispute between Canadair and Northrop, two more CF-5Ds were built and delivered to Venezuela in 1974. Their first base of operations was the General Rafael Urdaneta Air Base in Maracaibo. After 1974, the fleet was relocated to Teniente Vicente Landaeta Gil Air Base in Barquisimeto.

In 1979, after several upgrades to the fleet's communication, navigation and approximation equipment, the aircraft were renamed VF-5s, designating the CF-5As as VF-5As and the CF-5Ds as VF-5Ds. Venezuelan F-5s could also carry weaponry such as the AIM-9 Sidewinder missile, Mk.82 and M117 bombs, and 70mm rocket launchers.

In 1991, after tensions between Colombia and Venezuela almost led to a conflict, the air force started yet another modernization program for the F-5s, called "Proyecto Grifo" (Project Gryphon). Some aircraft (VF-5D number 5681 and VF-5A number 9124) were sent to Singapore for testing, then brought back for upgrade of the remaining airframes. That same year, a small fleet of four NF-5Bs and a single NF-5A, was acquired from the Netherlands to replace aircraft lost in previous years.

In 1992, during the coup d'état attempt against president Carlos Andres Perez, 3 F-5s were lost to a rebel-operated OV-10 Bronco bombing Barquisimeto Air Base. The failed coup delayed the modernization program for a year, finally coming together in 1993. The fleet was equipped with inertial laser navigation systems (similar to those in Venezuelan F-16s), IFFs, HUDs, refueling probes and modernized engines with an estimated lifespan of 22 years.

In 2002, small upgrades were made to the remaining F-5s. The fleet was kept operational until 2010, when a batch of Hongdu JL-8s was delivered as their replacement. By late 2010, it was known that at least one VF-5D was in flight-worthy condition; it is unknown if more aircraft are in operational condition.

Between 1972 and 2002, a total of nine Venezuelan F-5s were lost.

=== Botswana ===
The Air Arm Command of the Botswana Defence Forces underwent its largest expansion in the 1990s, where it also sought to add more combat capability and to augment its BAC Strikemaster fleet originally acquired from New Zealand. In 1996, the replacement of its Strikemasters with CF-116s began, with the delivery of ten CF-116As and three CF-116Bs (locally designated as the CF-5A and CF-5D). Three additional single seaters and two dual seaters were acquired in 2000 from Canadian Surplus stocks. Originally, these aircraft were split between squadrons Z-18 and Z-28 (at Sir Seretse Khama International Airport near Gabarone, and Thebephatshwa Airbase near Molerpole) but were later consolidated at Z28 Squadron and stationed at Maparangwane Air Base.

== Variants ==
- CF-5A : Single-seat fighter version for the Canadian Forces, designation CF-116A. 89 built. 13 sold to Botswana and 16 sold to Venezuela.
- CF-5A(R) : Single-seat reconnaissance version for the Canadian Forces. 50 interchangeable camera noses built to swap the CF-5A's twin 20mm cannon nose with a quad 70mm Vinten camera nose. Canadian Forces provisional designation CF-116A(R).
- CF-5D : Two-seat training version for the Canadian Forces, CF-116D. 46 built. 5 sold to Botswana and 4 sold to Venezuela.
- NF-5A : Single-seat fighter version for the Royal Netherlands Air Force. 75 built. 1 sold to Venezuela and 10 donated to Greece.
- NF-5/2000: The F-5/2000 modernisation programme for the Turkish Air Force was to upgrade the NF-5A/B and F-5A/B jets, to serve as lead-in trainers for the F-16C/D, by Israeli Aerospace Industries and Turkish Aerospace. The upgrade covers two areas – with a structural upgrade as well as an avionics modernisation such as MIL-STD-553 datalink, HUD, MFD, HOTAS, RWR, GPS+INS and ASELSAN CNI system. Currently used by the Turkish Stars Team.
- NF-5B : Two-seat training version for the Royal Netherlands Air Force. 30 built. 6 sold to Venezuela and 2 donated to Greece.
- VF-5A : Single-seat fighter version sold to Venezuelan Air Force.
- VF-5D : Two-seat training version sold to Venezuelan Air Force.

== Operators ==
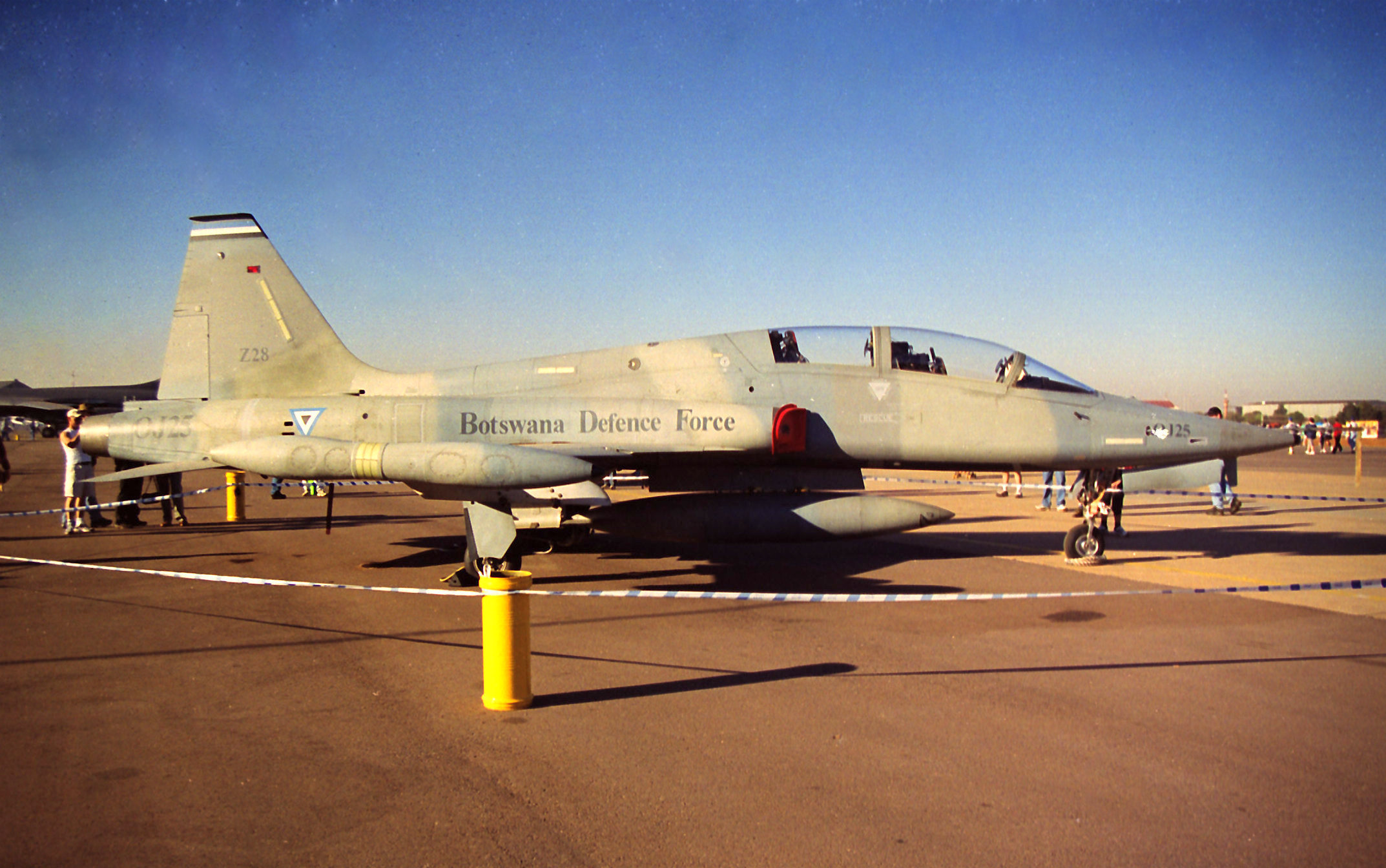
CF-5 of the Botswana Defence Force

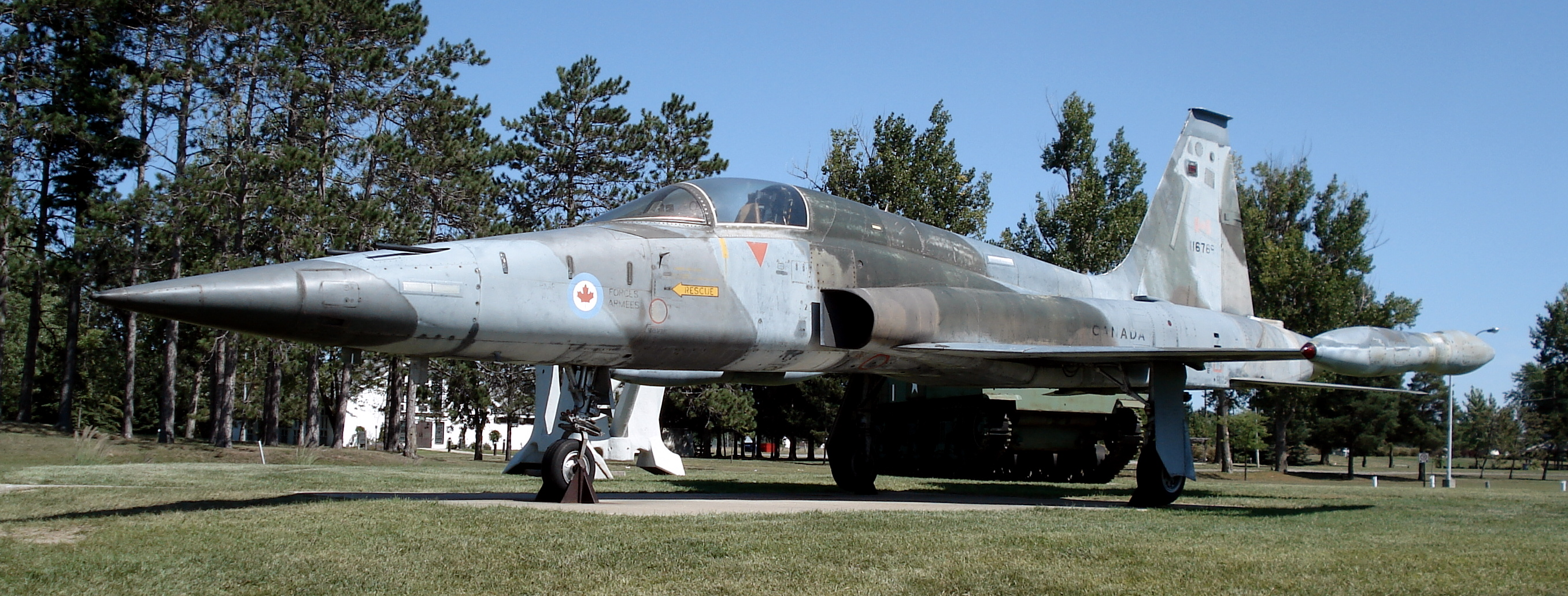
Canadian Air Force CF-116 Freedom Fighter, displayed at CFB Borden

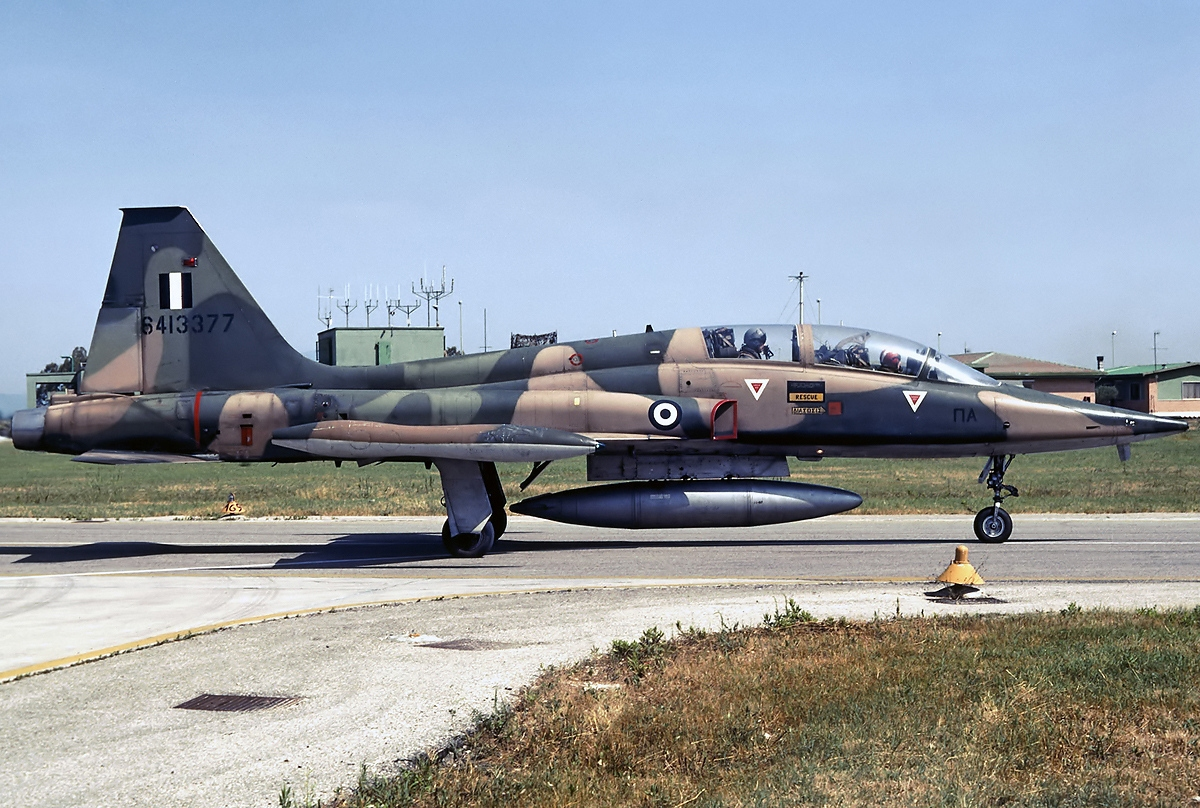
Greek CF-5B Freedom Fighter

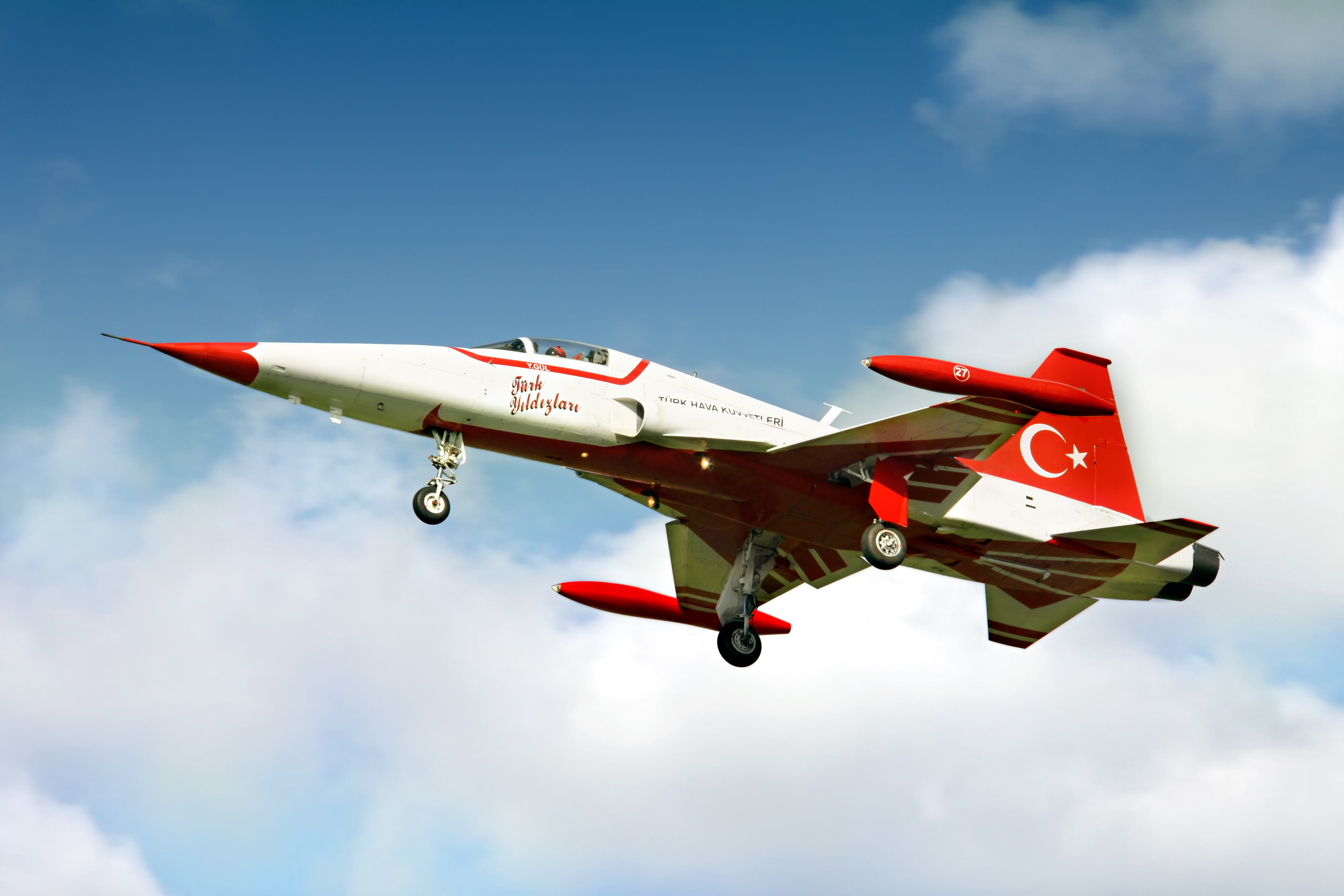
NF-5A of the Turkish Air Force.

Botswana

- Botswana Air Force
  - Total of 18 ex-Canadian fighters delivered in 1996 and 2000; (13 CF-5A and 5 CF-5D). All assigned at Z28 Squadron and stationed at Maparangwane Air Base. 11 CF-5A and 4 CF-5D were still in use as of 2021.

Turkey

- Turkish Air Force
  - 19 NF-5A/B 2000 Freedom Fighters were in service as of 2021, used as trainers and flying with 133rd Aerobatic Squadron Turkish Stars.

United States

- Tactical Air Support, Inc.
  - In 2013, the company added four CF-5Ds and 20 years' worth of spare F-5 parts to its fleet.

=== Former operators ===
Canada

- Canadian Forces Air Command
  - 419 Squadron
  - 433 Squadron
  - 434 Squadron
- Aerospace Engineering Test Establishment
  - 8 CF-5D aircraft assigned to AETE from 1968 to 1996

Greece

- Hellenic Air Force
  - 12 NF-5s (10 NF-5As, one NF-5B and one NF-5B for spares) were donated by the Netherlands to Greece in 1991 for use with 349 "Kronos" Squadron. They were withdrawn in 2001.

Netherlands

- Royal Netherlands Air Force 105 NF-5 (75 single and 30 dual seaters) were introduced into service between 1969 and 1972, decommissioned in 1991
  - No. 313 Squadron; Twente Air Base (transitioned to F-16 in 1987)
  - No. 314 Squadron; Eindhoven Air Base (transitioned to F-16 in 1990)
  - No. 315 Squadron, Operation Conversion Unit (OCU); Twente Air Base (transitioned to F-16 in 1986)
  - No. 316 Squadron; Gilze-Rijen Air Base (transitioned to F-16 in 1991)
  - Field Technic Training Unit NF-5 (1971–1984); Twente Air Base

Venezuela

- Venezuelan Air Force
  - Air Group 12 (retired in 2010).

== Aircraft on display ==
=== Canada ===
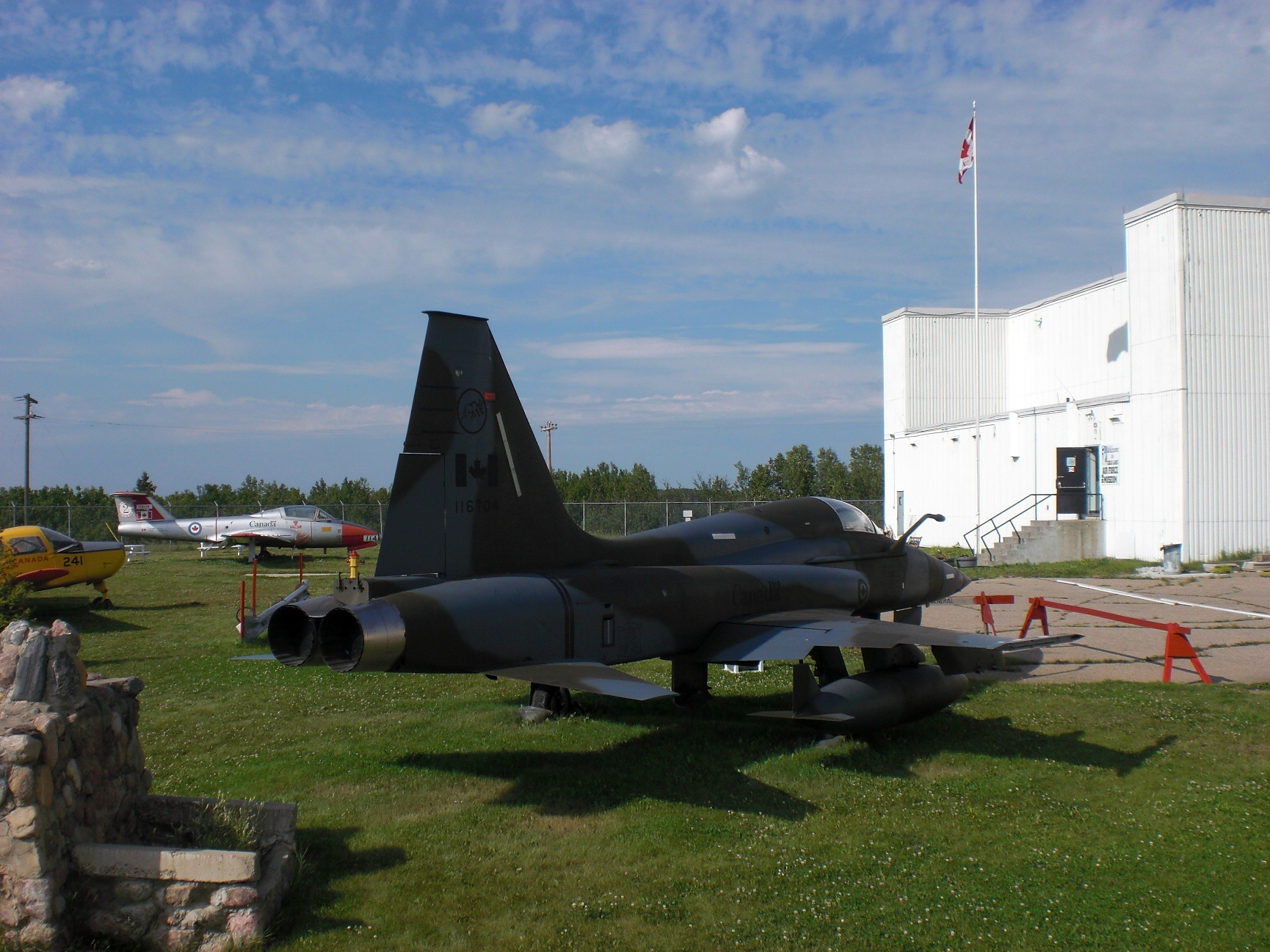
CF-5A on display at the Cold Lake Air Force Museum

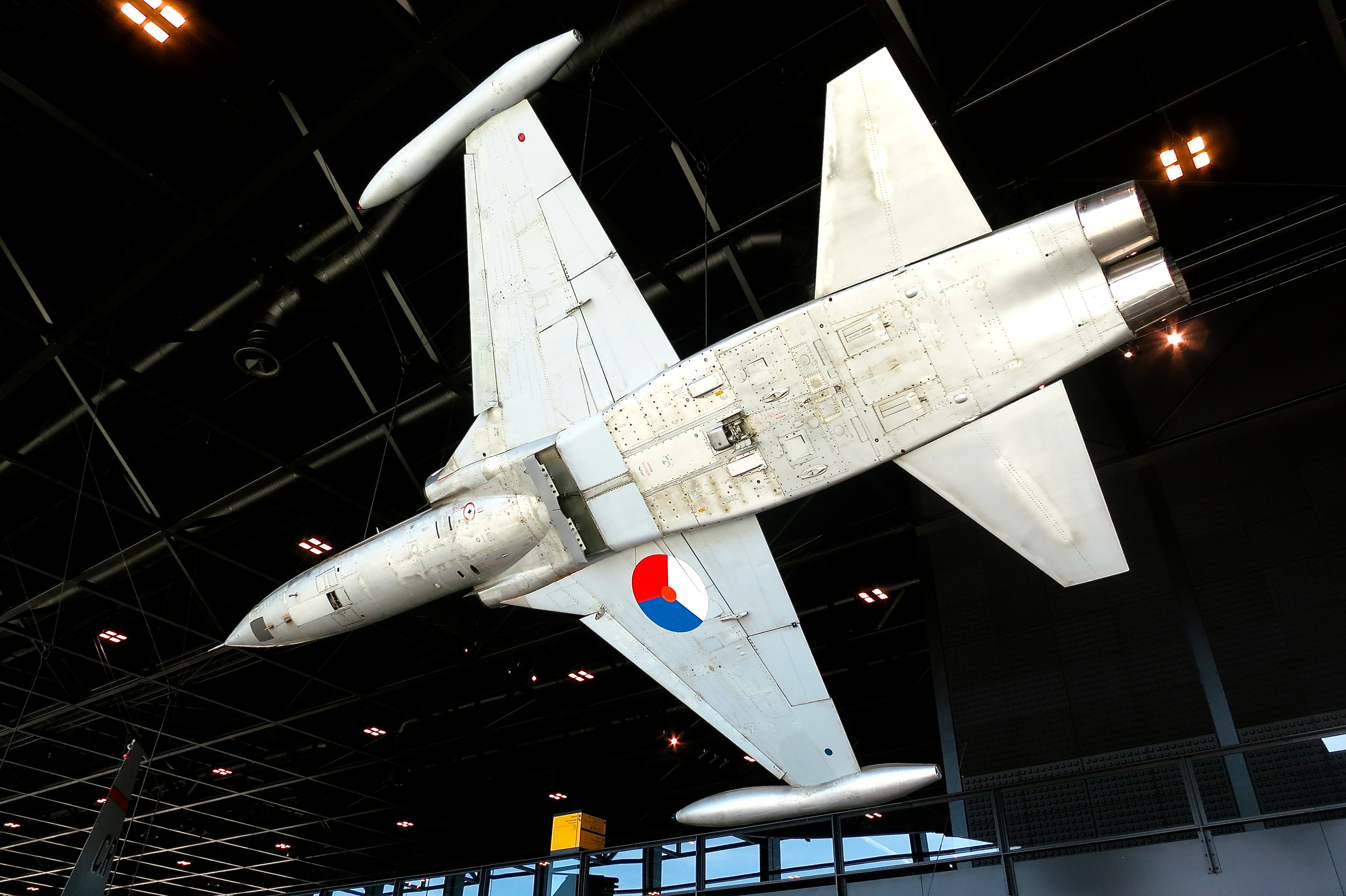
NF-5A on display at the Nationaal Militair Museum

- CF-116A, s/n 116702 - Canadian War Museum, Ottawa.
- CF-116A, s/n 116704 - Cold Lake Air Force Museum, Cold Lake.
- CF-116A, s/n 116707 - The Military Museums, Calgary.
- CF-116A, s/n 116721 - National Air Force Museum of Canada, Trenton.
- CF-116A, s/n 116739 - National Air Force Museum of Canada, Trenton. This airframe belongs to the museum but is displayed offsite, next to a Ramada Hotel in Trenton.
- CF-116A, s/n 116740 - Kamloops Airport.
- CF-116A. s/n 116748 - Atlantic Canada Aviation Museum, Goffs, Nova Scotia.
- CF-116A, s/n 116757 - Canadian Warplane Heritage Museum, Hamilton.
- CF-116A, s/n 116763 - Canada Aviation and Space Museum, Ottawa.
- CF-116D, s/n 116815 - Reynolds-Alberta Museum, Wetaskiwin, Alberta.
- CFB Cold Lake - CF-5A '116736' mounted on a pole near the base entrance.
- Defence Research and Development Canada – Toronto (DRDC) (mounted on Sheppard Avenue West), Toronto, Ontario
- Memorial Military Museum in Campbellford, Ontario (s/n 116730).
- Air Force Heritage Museum and Air Park, Winnipeg, Manitoba
- Toronto/Markham Airport 2 located at Markham, Ontario

=== The Netherlands ===
- NF-5A 'K-3003' on display at Gilze-Rijen Air Base, the Netherlands
- NF-5A 'K-3020' on display at Nationaal Militair Museum, former Soesterberg Air Base, the Netherlands
- NF-5A 'K-3068' on display at Eindhoven Air Base, the Netherlands
- NF-5B 'K-4011' in storage at Nationaal Militair Museum, former Soesterberg Air Base, the Netherlands.
- NF-5B 'K-4012' as instructional airframe at Deltion College Zwolle, the Netherlands

== Specifications (CF-116) ==
Orthographically projected diagram of an F-5 Freedom Fighter

General characteristics

- Crew: one–two
- Length: 47 ft 2 in (14.38 m)
- Wingspan: 25 ft 10 in (7.87 m)
- Height: 13 ft 2 in (4.01 m)
- Wing area: 186 sq ft (17.28 m^{2})
- Empty weight: 8,681 lb (3,938 kg)
- Max takeoff weight: 20,390 lb (9,249 kg)
- Powerplant: 2 × Orenda-built GE J85-15 turbojet, 2,925 lbf (13.01 kN) thrust each dry, 4,300 lbf (19 kN) with afterburner

Performance

- Maximum speed: 978 mph (1,575 km/h, 850 kn)
- Maximum speed: Mach 1.4
- Range: 875 mi (1,400 km, 760 nmi)
- Service ceiling: 41,000 ft (12,000 m)
- Rate of climb: 34,400 ft/min (175 m/s)

Armament

- Guns: 2× 20 mm (0.787 in) Pontiac M39A2 cannons in the nose, 280 rounds/gun
- Hardpoints: 5 with a capacity of 7,000 lb (3,200 kg), with provisions to carry combinations of:
  - Rockets: 2× CRV7 rocket pods
    or 2× LAU-10 rocket pods with 4× Zuni 127 mm rockets each
    or 2× Matra rocket pods with 18× 68 mm SNEB rockets each
  - Bombs: a variety of air-to-ground ordnance, such as the Mark 80 series of unguided iron bombs (including 3 kg and 14 kg practice bombs), U.S. CBU-24/49/52/58 and British BL755 cluster bomb munitions, M129 Leaflet bomb
  - Other: drop tanks for extended range
- Missiles: 2× AIM-9 Sidewinder air-to-air missiles

== See also ==
Related development

- Northrop F-5

Aircraft of comparable role, configuration, and era

- Dassault Étendard
- Fiat G.91
- Mikoyan-Gurevich MiG-21
- Chengdu J-7

Related lists

- List of aircraft of Canada's air forces
- List of fighter aircraft
