= BAC Strikemaster =

Light attack aircraft by the British Aircraft Company, later British Aerospace

BAC 167 Strikemaster
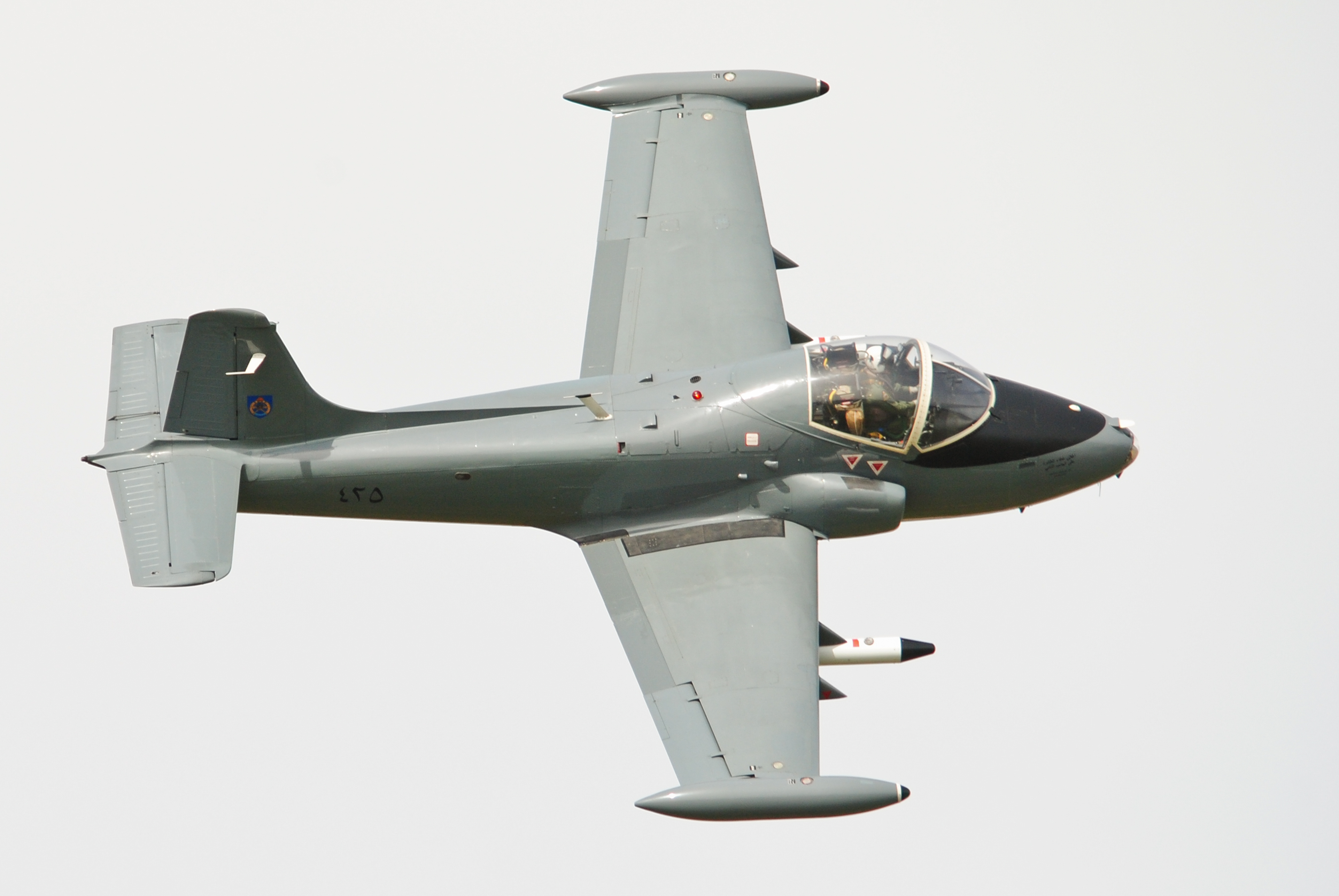
- BAC 167 Strikemaster Mk 82A in Sultan of Oman's Air Force colour scheme at the 2013 Shoreham Airshow

General information
- Type: Attack aircraft, Jet trainer
- Manufacturer: British Aircraft Corporation
- Status: Retired
- Primary users: Royal Saudi Air Force Ecuadorian Air Force; Kenya Air Force; Royal New Zealand Air Force
- Number built: 146

History
- Manufactured: 1967–1983
- First flight: 26 October 1967
- Retired: 1993
- Developed from: BAC Jet Provost

The BAC 167 Strikemaster is a jet-powered training and light attack aircraft designed and produced by the British Aircraft Corporation. It was a development of the Hunting Jet Provost trainer, itself a jet engined version of the Percival Provost, which originally flew in 1950 with a radial engine.

The Strikemaster is essentially an armed version of the Jet Provost T Mk 5. Various improvements and alterations were made to the aircraft, including an uprated Armstrong Siddeley Viper turbojet engine, wing hardpoints capable of carrying a wide variety of munitions, a pair of machine guns under the intakes, uprated flap system with two jacks, enlarged airbrake jacks, new communication and navigation gear, different electrical system, canopy breakers on the ejection seats, and a revised fuel system including tip tanks on the wing tips.

First flown in 1967, the aircraft was typically marketed as a light attack or counter-insurgency aircraft, however, the majority of customers were air forces seeking an advanced trainer. The Strikemaster did see combat on multiple occasions in the service of Ecuador, Oman and Yemen. A total of 146 aircraft were produced prior to the end of production in 1983. The type remains flying into the 2020s, albeit with increasing difficulty due to a decreasing supply of spare parts over time.

== Design and development ==
During the 1950s, the Hunting Jet Provost had entered service as the Royal Air Force (RAF), becoming the first ab initio jet trainer to be standardised by any air service in the world. In the 1960s, the British Aircraft Corporation, which had acquired Hunting Percival, and therefore the Jet Provost, proceeded with the development of a counter-insurgency/light attack derivative of the type, which it designated as the BAC 167. By this point, it had become apparent that several of the competitions that the Jet Provost had been entered into had decided against the type due to its perceived lack of potential firepower.

It was powered by a single Armstrong Siddeley Viper turbojet, akin to the Jet Provost; however, this engine was uprated to produce up to 3,140 lb (14.0 kN) of thrust. The fuel system was also revised, incorporating conformal fuel tanks upon the wingtips along with the option to fit up to four 75-gallon underwing drop tanks, which extend the aircraft's endurance and effective combat radius when required. Furthermore, key areas of the airframe, such as the wings, were stressed to withstand the additional loads incurred by the carriage of a variety of munitions.

Up to 3,000 lb (1,400 kg) of stores could be carried by the Strikemaster upon four hardpoints present underneath its wings. Underwing munitions could include up to four 500lb bombs, 24 SURA R80 rockets, eight 25lb practice bombs, eight 20lb fragmentation bombs, four 18-tube SNEB 68mm rocket pods, a pair of 0.5 inch mini-gun pods. In addition, a pair of 7.62mm FN machine guns were present within the lower intake lips while a G90 gun camera could be installed in the nose cone. A variety of gunsights could be provided for one or both of the crew.

The Strikemaster was outfitted with dual ejection seats that were suitable even for low-altitude escape. A key advantage of the type was its dual-role capability, being suitable for use in both the trainer and ground attack roles. Furthermore, the Strikemaster was capable of operating from relatively austere air strips; these attributes led to the type being widely used by numerous overseas nations as a relatively affordable combat aircraft.

On 26 October 1967, the first prototype performed its maiden flight from Warton Aerodrome; a total of two prototypes were produced for company trials. As the result of an internal competition, the aircraft was given the name Strikemaster, which received official endorsement in October 1968. Production of the type was initially centred at Warton; however, during the late 1970s, final assembly was transferred to Hurn Airport. Sales of the type slowed during the early 1980s, leading to discontinuation of production.

== Operational history ==
During May 1966, Saudi Arabia became the first country to place an order for the type, opting for an initial batch of 25 Strikemaster Mk 80 aircraft as part of a wider air defence order. On 26 August 1968, the Royal Saudi Air Force took delivery of its first examples; deliveries continued through to May 1978. In Saudi service, the Strikemaster was used in both the training and light attack roles.

Another key early customer for the Strikemaster was Oman, which ordered the type in 1967 and took delivery in the summer of 1969. On several occasions during the Dhofar Rebellion, the Royal Air Force of Oman conducted combat missions with the type, the earliest such strikes being reportedly conducted in October 1969. A particularly notable engagement occurred during July 1972, which has since been referred to as the Battle of Mirbat; a total of four Omani Strikemasters provided close air support to heavily outnumbered ground forces that were under attack by roughly 300 insurgents. Three Strikemasters were shot down over the course of the conflict, including one that was allegedly lost to an SA-7 surface-to-air missile.

During the early 1970s, the Kenyan Air Force introduced the Strikemaster as part of a wider modernisation programme. The Kenyan fleet often operated in close conjunction with its first combat jet fighter, the Hawker Hunter.

Following the creation of the Botswana Defence Force Air Wing in April 1977 amid escalating regional tensions, the service acquired nine refurbished Strikemasters formerly flown in Kenya and Kuwait. During the late 1990s, the type was withdrawn following their replacement by second hand Canadair CF-5s; most of the surviving aircraft were sold onto the private sector.

The Ecuadorian Air Force deployed the Strikemaster during the brief 1995 Cenepa War, flying ground sorties against Peruvian positions. An Ecuadorian Strikemaster crashed during a training mission in the Northern Border area, near Colombia, on 25 March 2009. Both pilots ejected; one later died of injuries received during the rescue attempt.

The Strikemaster was also operated by several private enterprises, such as Blue Air Training and Global Aviation; such businesses typically used them to conduct training activities.

Operations by the type were restricted by most military users after the Royal New Zealand Air Force found fatigue cracking in the wings of its aircraft. By the end of the 2010s, there was a shortage of several key components, such as brakes and starter generators, making it increasingly hard to keep the Strikemaster airworthy. Many aircraft retired by Botswana, New Zealand, Saudi Arabia and Singapore are in museums and private collections.

== Variants ==
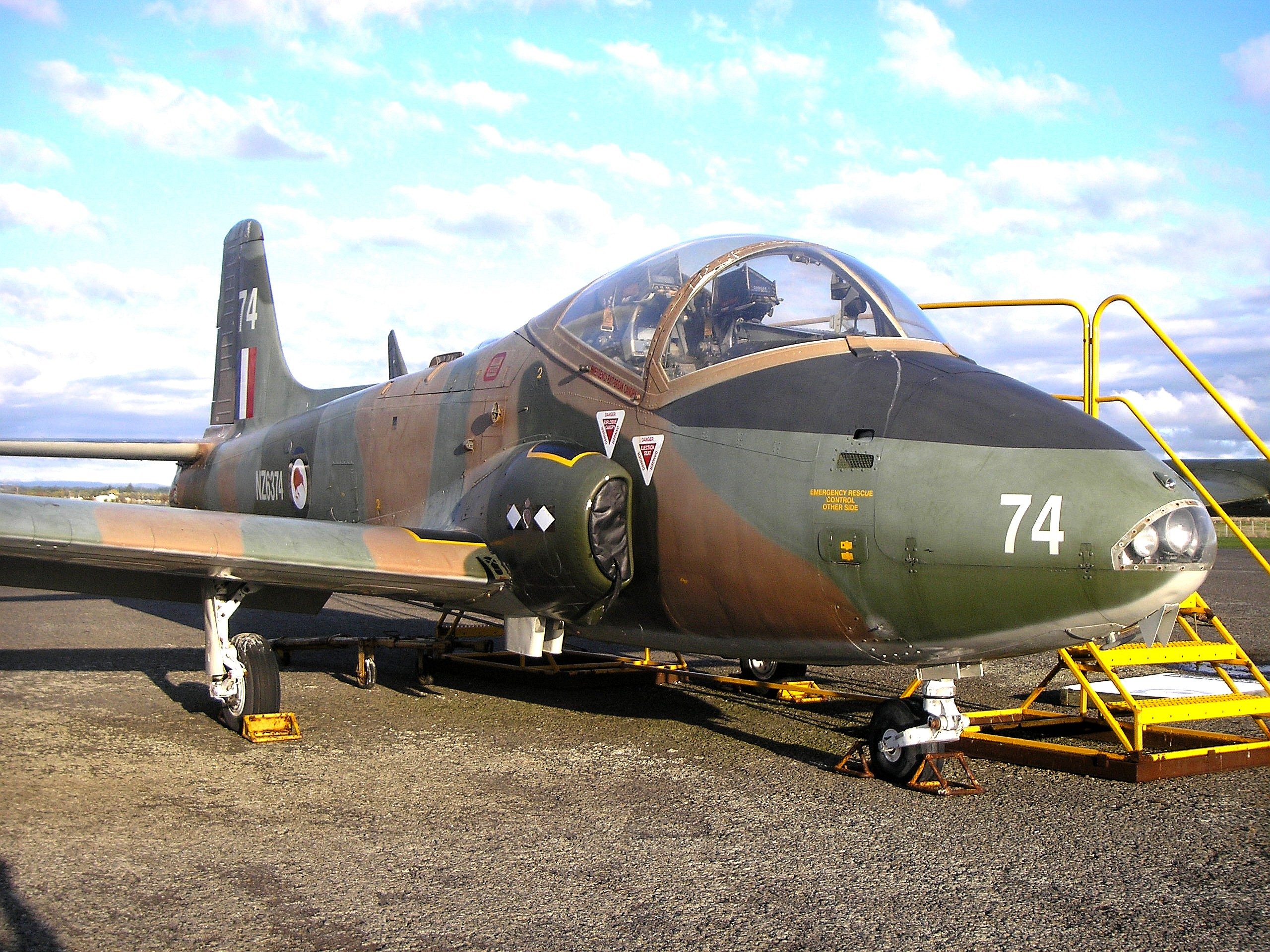
Photographed 14 years after it was retired, this BAC Strikemaster still wears the colours of No. 14 Squadron RNZAF.

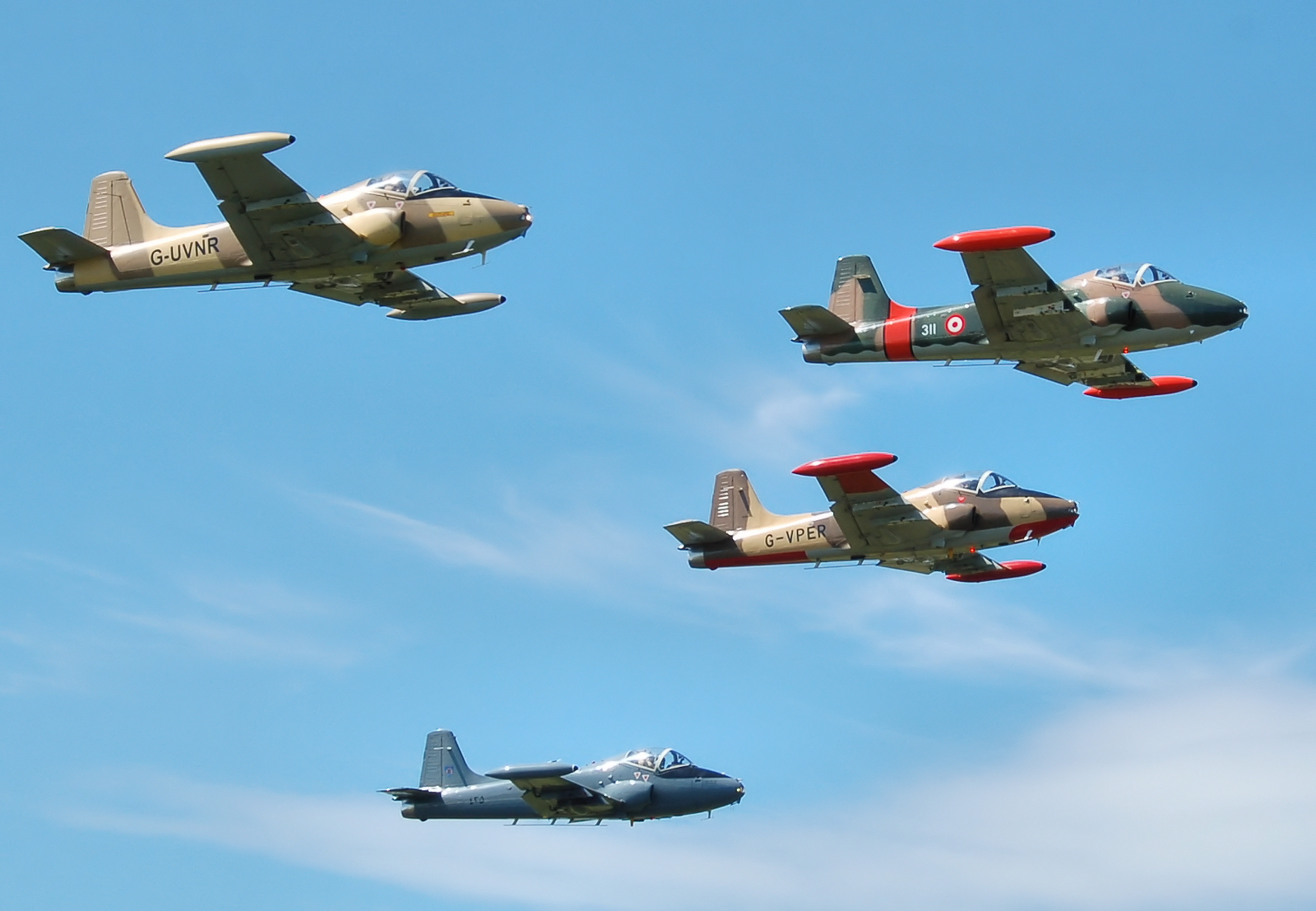
The four BAC Strikemasters of the UK aerobatics display team Team Viper at Cotswold Airport, Gloucestershire, England

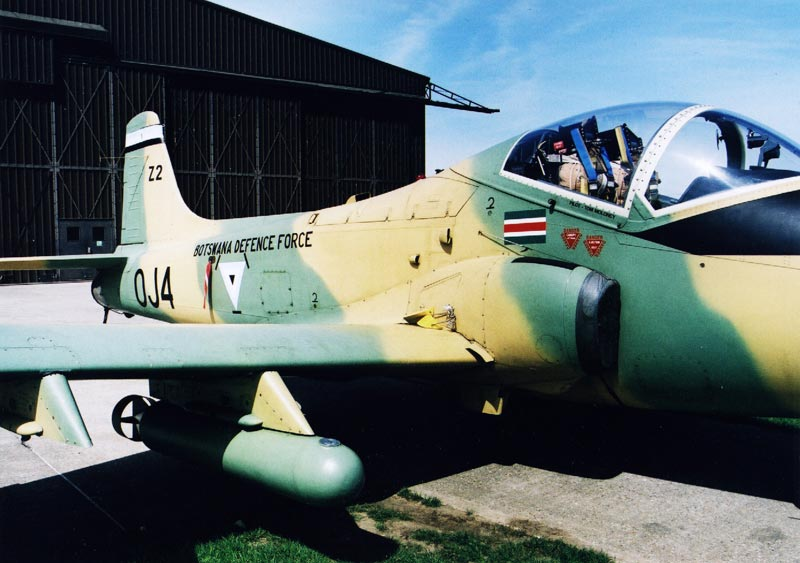
One of Botswana's Strikemasters

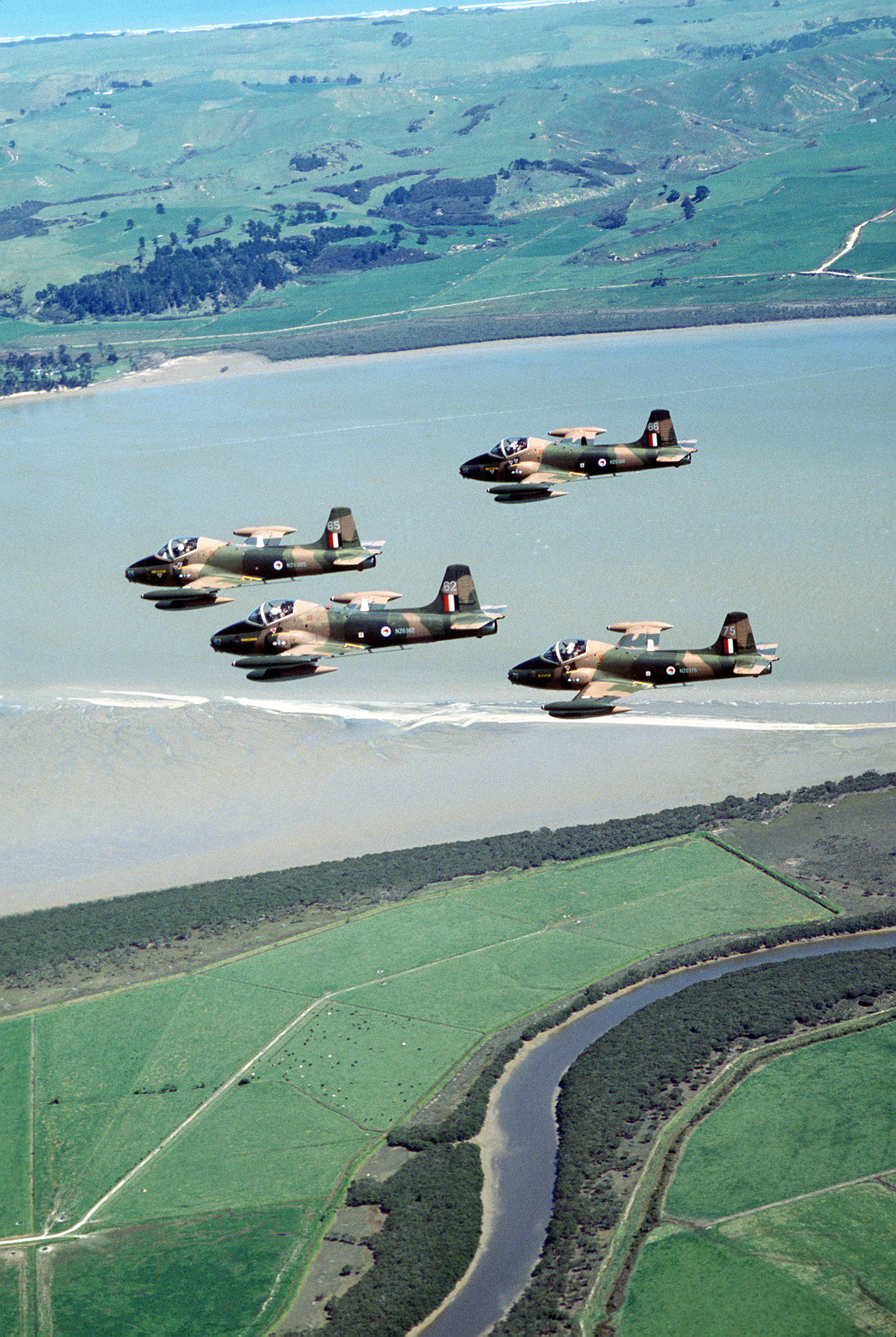
RNZAF Strikemasters in 1984

- Strikemaster Mk 80 : Export version for Saudi Arabia, 25 aircraft.
- Strikemaster Mk 80A: 22 aircraft were sold to Saudi Arabia as part of a follow-up order.
- Strikemaster Mk 81 : Export version for South Yemen, four aircraft.
- Strikemaster Mk 82 : Export version for Oman, 12 aircraft.
- Strikemaster Mk 82A: 13 aircraft were sold to Oman as a second order.
- Strikemaster Mk 83 : Export version for Kuwait, 12 aircraft.
- Strikemaster Mk 84 : Export version for Singapore, 16 aircraft.
- Strikemaster Mk 87 : Export version for Kenya, six aircraft.
- Strikemaster Mk 88 : Export version for New Zealand, 16 aircraft.
- Strikemaster Mk 89 : Export version for Ecuador, 22 aircraft.
- Strikemaster Mk 89A: 6 were sold to Ecuador as a second order.
- Strikemaster Mk 90 : Export version for Sudan, 4 aircraft.

=== Production ===
- Strikemaster 80: 136
- Strikemaster 90: 10

== Operators ==
Botswana

- Botswana Defence Force Air Wing briefly operated a total of 9 secondhand Kuwaiti Mk 83s and Kenyan Mk 87s, with two aircraft later sold to Ivory Coast.

Ecuador

- Ecuadorian Air Force received 22 Strikemaster Mk 89 and 6 Mk 89A aircraft.

Ivory Coast

- Ivorian Air Force purchased 2 former Botswanan Strikemasters. One was destroyed during the 2004 French–Ivorian clashes.

Kenya

- Kenya Air Force received 6 Strikemaster Mk 87 aircraft.

Kuwait

- Kuwait Air Force received 12 Strikemaster Mk 83 aircraft.

New Zealand

- Royal New Zealand Air Force
  - No. 14 Squadron RNZAF received 16 BAC Strikemaster Mk 88 aircraft.
- Strikemaster Ltd operates 3 former RNZAF Strikemaster Mk 88 aircraft.

Oman

- Royal Air Force of Oman received 12 Strikemaster Mk 82 and 13 Mk 82A aircraft.
  - No. 1 Squadron SOAF, later RAFO.

Saudi Arabia

- Royal Saudi Air Force received 25 Strikemaster Mk 80 and 22 Mk 80A aircraft.
  - No. 9 Squadron RSAF

Singapore

- Republic of Singapore Air Force received 16 Strikemaster Mk 84 aircraft. All were retired in 1984.

South Yemen

- People's Democratic Republic of Yemen Air Force received 4 Strikemaster Mk 81s in 1970.

Sudan

- Sudanese Air Force received 4 Strikemaster Mk 90s in 1983.

== Specifications (Strikemaster Mk 88) ==
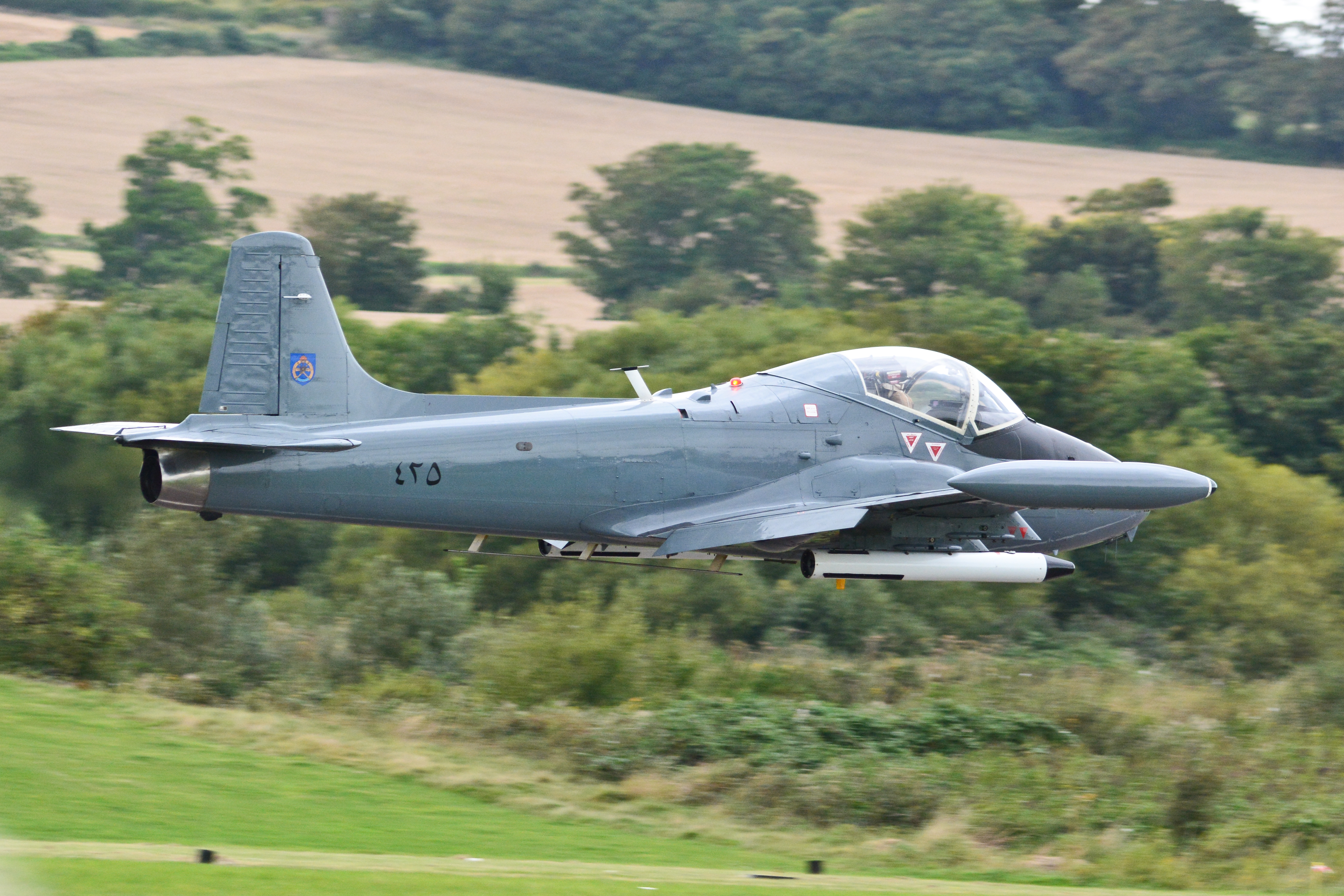
BAC Strikemaster, Shoreham Airshow 2014

Data from Jane's All The World's Aircraft 1976–77

General characteristics

- Crew: Two
- Length: 33 ft 8 1/2 in (10.274 m)
- Wingspan: 36 ft 10 in (11.23 m)
- Height: 10 ft 11 1/2 in (3.340 m)
- Wing area: 213.7 sq ft (19.85 m^{2})
- Airfoil: NACA 23015 (modified) at root, NACA 4412 (modified) at tip
- Empty weight: 6,195 lb (2,810 kg)
- Gross weight: 9,303 lb (4,220 kg) pilot training
- Max takeoff weight: 11,500 lb (5,216 kg)
- Fuel capacity: 366 imp gal (440 US gal; 1,660 L) total including tip tanks
- Powerplant: 1 × Rolls-Royce Viper Mk.535 turbojet, 3,140 lbf (14.0 kN) thrust

Performance

- Maximum speed: 481 mph (774 km/h, 418 kn) at 18,000 ft (5,500 m)
- Stall speed: 98 mph (158 km/h, 85 kn) flaps down
- Never exceed speed: 518 mph (834 km/h, 450 kn)
- Range: 1,382 mi (2,224 km, 1,201 nmi)
- Combat range: 145 mi (233 km, 126 nmi) combat radius: with 3,000 lb (1,400 kg) weapons, lo-lo-lo profile
- Service ceiling: 40,000 ft (12,000 m)
- Rate of climb: 5,250 ft/min (26.7 m/s)

Armament

- Guns: 2× 7.62 mm machine guns with 550 rounds each
- Hardpoints: Four (two per wing) with a capacity of 3,000 lb (1,400 kg) of bombs, machine gun pods, air-to-ground rocket pods, fuel drop tanks, and napalm tanks.

== See also ==
Related development

- BAC Jet Provost
- Percival Provost

Aircraft of comparable role, configuration, and era

- Aermacchi MB 326
- Aero L-39 Albatros (specifically Z-versions)
- Cessna A-37 Dragonfly
- Canadair CL-41G Tebuan
- HAL HJT-16 Kiran

Related lists

- List of attack aircraft
