= Air Arm Command (Botswana) =

Air warfare branch of Botswana's military forces

- Emblem of the Botswana Defence Force
- Founded: 1960; 66 years ago
- Country: Botswana
- Type: Air force
- Role: Aerial warfare
- Size: 500 personnel
- Part of: Botswana Defence Force
- Headquarters: Gaborone

Commanders
- Commander-in-Chief: President Duma Boko

Insignia
- Roundel

- Fin flash

Aircraft flown
- Fighter: Canadair CF-5
- Helicopter: Bell 412SP, AS 350 Ecureuil
- Reconnaissance: Elbit Hermes 450, IAI Silver Arrow 180
- Trainer: Pilatus PC-7 Mk II
- Transport: C-130 Hercules, Beechcraft Super King Air, Britten-Norman Defender, CASA C-212 Aviocar, CASA CN-235, Bombardier Global Express

The Air Arm Command is the air force of the Botswana Defence Force. The Air Arm was formed in 1977 and squadrons are designated with a Z, meaning "squadron".

== Overview ==
The Air Arm Command was formed in 1977 and is part of the Botswana Defence Force. All squadrons are designated with a Z, which stands for "squadron". The main base is near Molepolole and was built by mostly foreign contractors between 1992 and 1996. Other airports used are Sir Seretse Khama International Airport and Francistown International Airport.

The backbone of the AAC is a squadron of former Canadian Canadair CF-116s, locally designated as BF-5s. These fighter jets were ordered in 1996 to replace the BAC Strikemaster, with another three single-seaters and two dual-seaters being delivered in 2000. (Note: Only 14 CF-5s (both single- and dual-seat versions) remain in service in 2009.) The aircraft were re-designated OJ-1 through 16. For transport, the AAC uses Britten-Norman Defenders, CASA C-212 Aviocars, CASA CN-235s and Lockheed C-130 Hercules. The latest addition to the transport fleet was a former United States Air Force C-130H Hercules.

A combination of Bell 412EP and 412SP helicopters are operated by Z21 and perform a variety of functions; search and rescue, medivac, anti-poaching and troop/VIP transport. In 1993, nine ex-US Army/AMARC Cessna O-2As were delivered for use against poaching.

In 2011, Pilatus Aircraft Ltd announced that the AAC had selected the PC-7 MkII turboprop trainer aircraft to replace their Pilatus PC-7 fleet which has been in service since 1990. The contract value is approximately 40 million Swiss francs to procure a fleet of five PC-7 MkII turboprop trainer aircraft, with ground-based training system including computer-based training, spares, support equipment, as well as pilot and technician conversion training elements. The contract was signed in Gaborone on 13 April 2011.

Botswana is also believed to operate Elbit Systems Silver Arrow and Elbit Hermes 450 UAVs.

=== Paul Morris money laundering case ===
Paul Morris, whom had a major role in the AAC, had made the decision to buy 10 Bell 412EP helicopters, however the funds were used in a money laundering case, being the largest in Botswana history. Paul Morris would later be sentenced to the death penalty in 1998, and was executed in 1999.

== Accidents and incidents ==
- On 20 October 2011, two PC-7s of the AAC were involved in a midair collision over Letlhakeng 100 km west of Gaborone. Two of the four aircrew involved were killed in the accident.
- On 27 June 2014, The Botswana Defence Force Air Arm lost a Eurocopter AS350 Ecureuil helicopter which crashed during a routine training at Thebephatshwa Air Base. Two pilots who were on board the aircraft, were taken to hospital in a stable condition.
- On 9 February 2017, a BDF CASA C-212 crashed near Thebephatshwa village minutes after leaving the Thebephatshwa Air Base, killing all three people on board. The aircraft was on its way to the capital, Gaborone, which is 90 km away.
- On 27 April 2018, a day before BDF Day, a BF-5 fighter aircraft crashed at the Gaborone Golf Club during aerobatic rehearsals. The pilot was the only recorded casualty.

== Organization ==
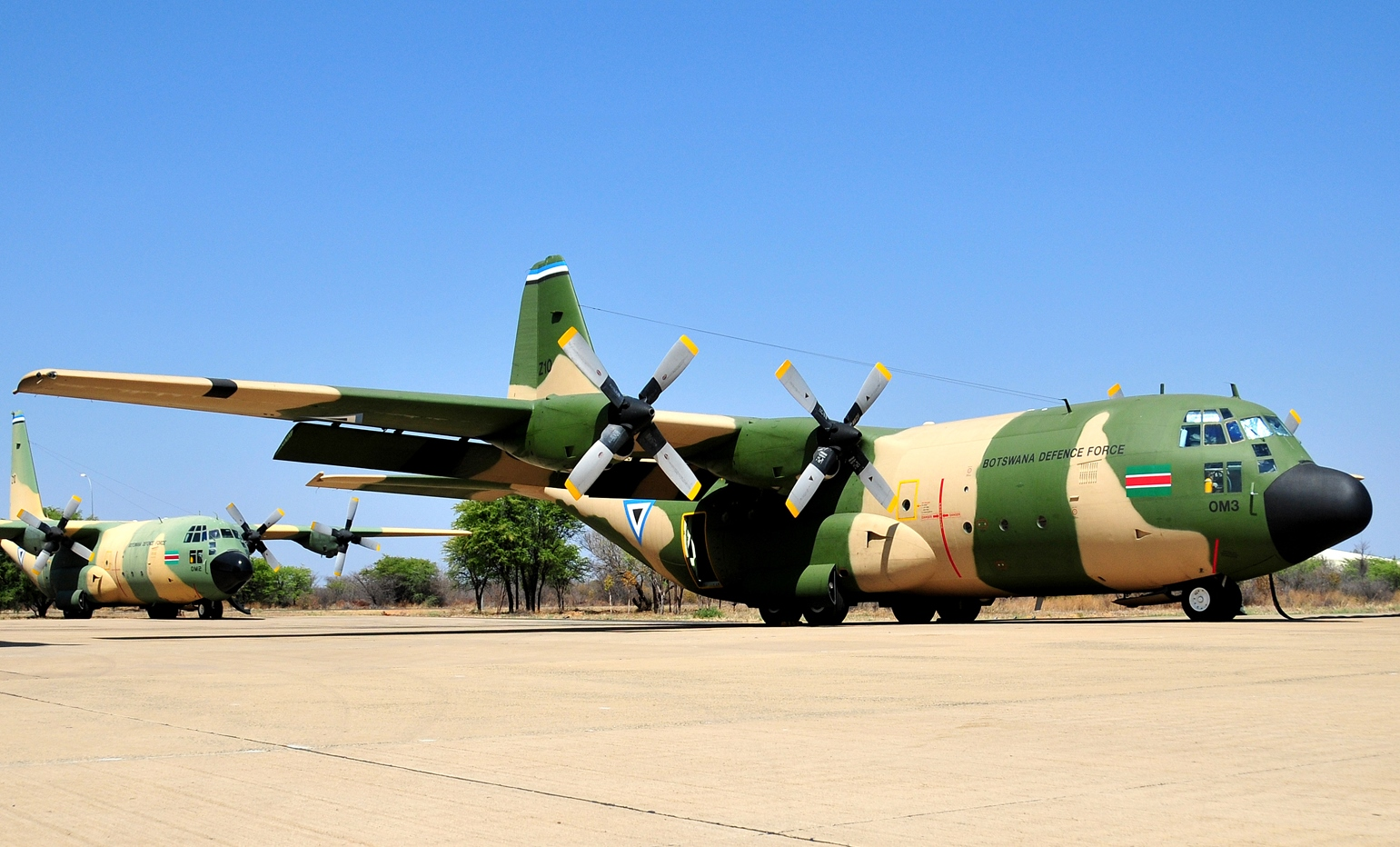
Two C-130s previously operated (these 2 planes in question have been retired) by the AAC.

- Z1 Transport Squadron – Maparangwane Air Base (Thebephatshwa/Molepolole)
- Z3 Transport (Liaison) Squadron – Francistown Airport
- Z7 Training Squadron – PC-7MkII, King Air 200 – Maparangwane Air Base (Thebephatshwa/Molepolole)
- Z10 Transport Squadron – C-130, C-212 and CN-235 – Maparangwane Air Base (Thebephatshwa/Molepolole)
- Z12 Transport Squadron – Francistown Airport
- Z21 Transport/Helicopter Squadron – Bell 412 – Maparangwane Air Base (Thebephatshwa/Molepolole)
- Z23 Transport/Helicopter Squadron – AS-350 – Maparangwane Air Base (Thebephatshwa/Molepolole)
- Z28 Fighter Squadron – CF-5 – Maparangwane Air Base (Thebephatshwa/Molepolole)
- VIP Flight Squadron – Sir Seretse Khama International Airport

=== Air bases ===
Maparangwane Air Base is the only full air base in Botswana. Sir Seretse Khama International Airport is a civilian airport that hosts the VIP jets and Francistown Airport is a joint civilian/military airfield with ownership by the BDF since 2011.

=== Air defence command and control system ===
In 2005 Botswana Defence Force (BDF) awarded the Spanish company Indra a €7.1 million contract for the development and implementation of a full air defence command and control system. The project included the development and implementation of an operational control centre, composed of a total of nine air traffic tracking and control posts to process and concentrate the information regarding the country's air space being provided by air surveillance radars, radio communication links with the airships, and air traffic management civil systems.

== Aircraft ==
=== Current inventory ===
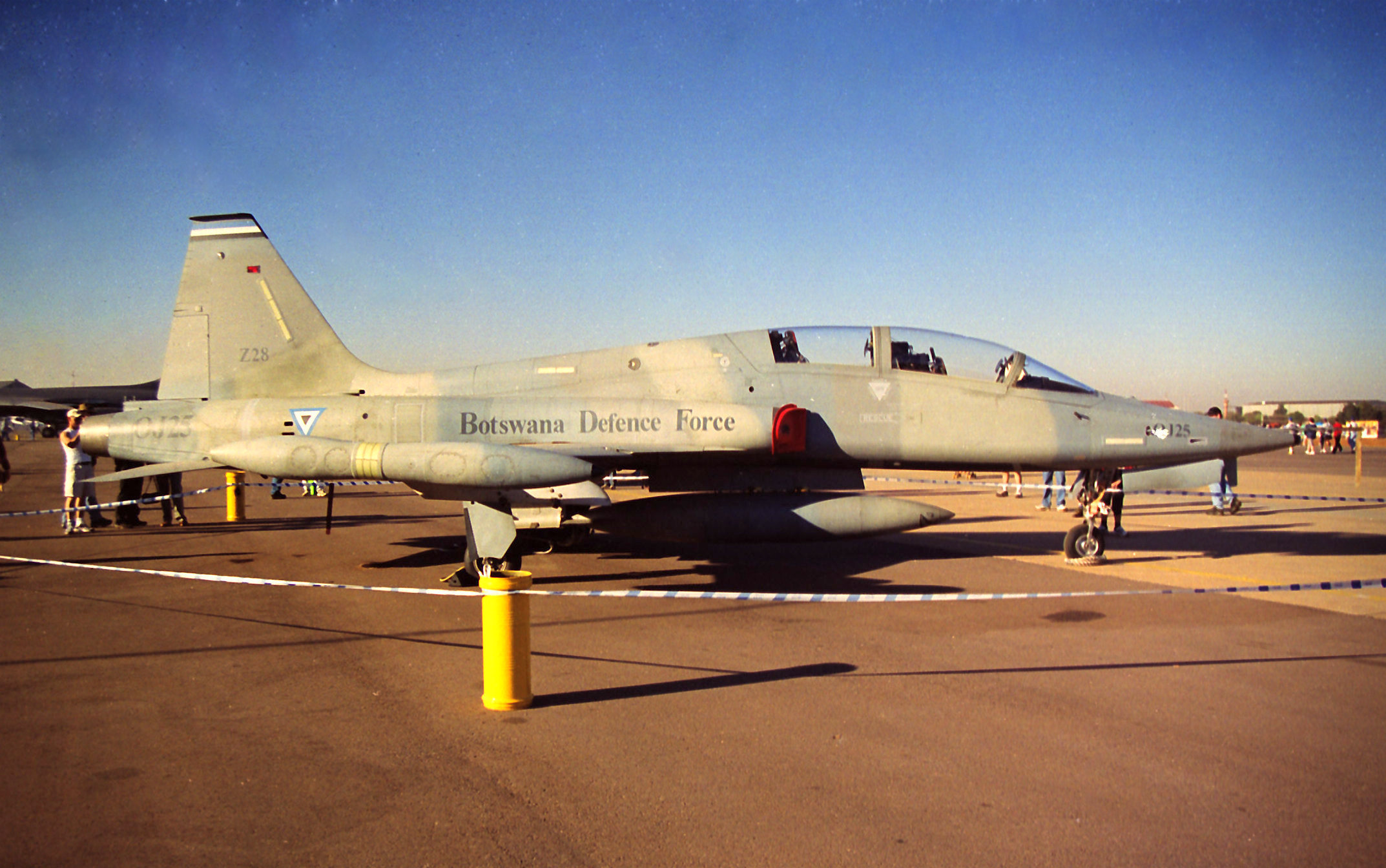
A Botswana Defence Force CF-5 on display

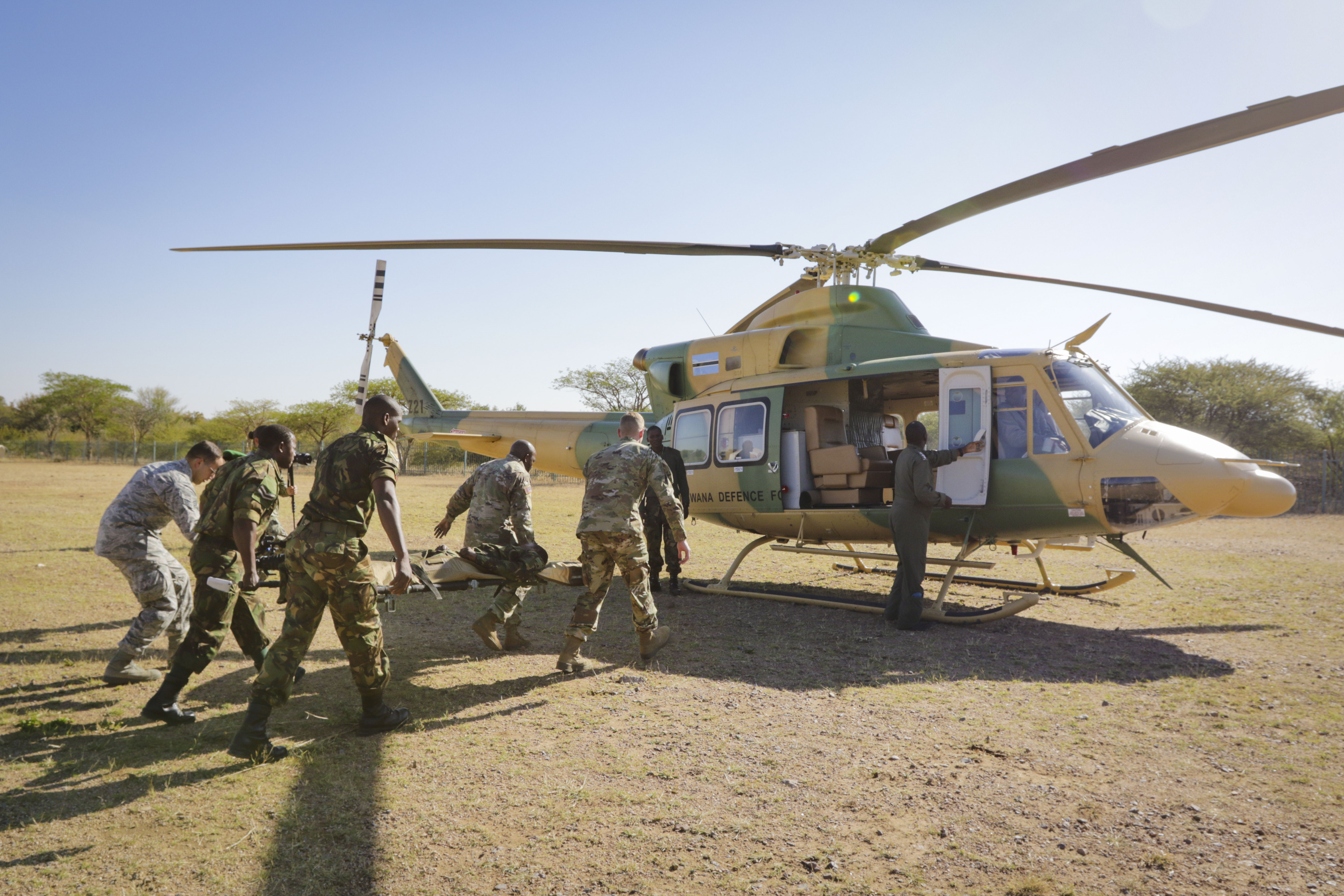
A BDF Bell 412 in 2019.

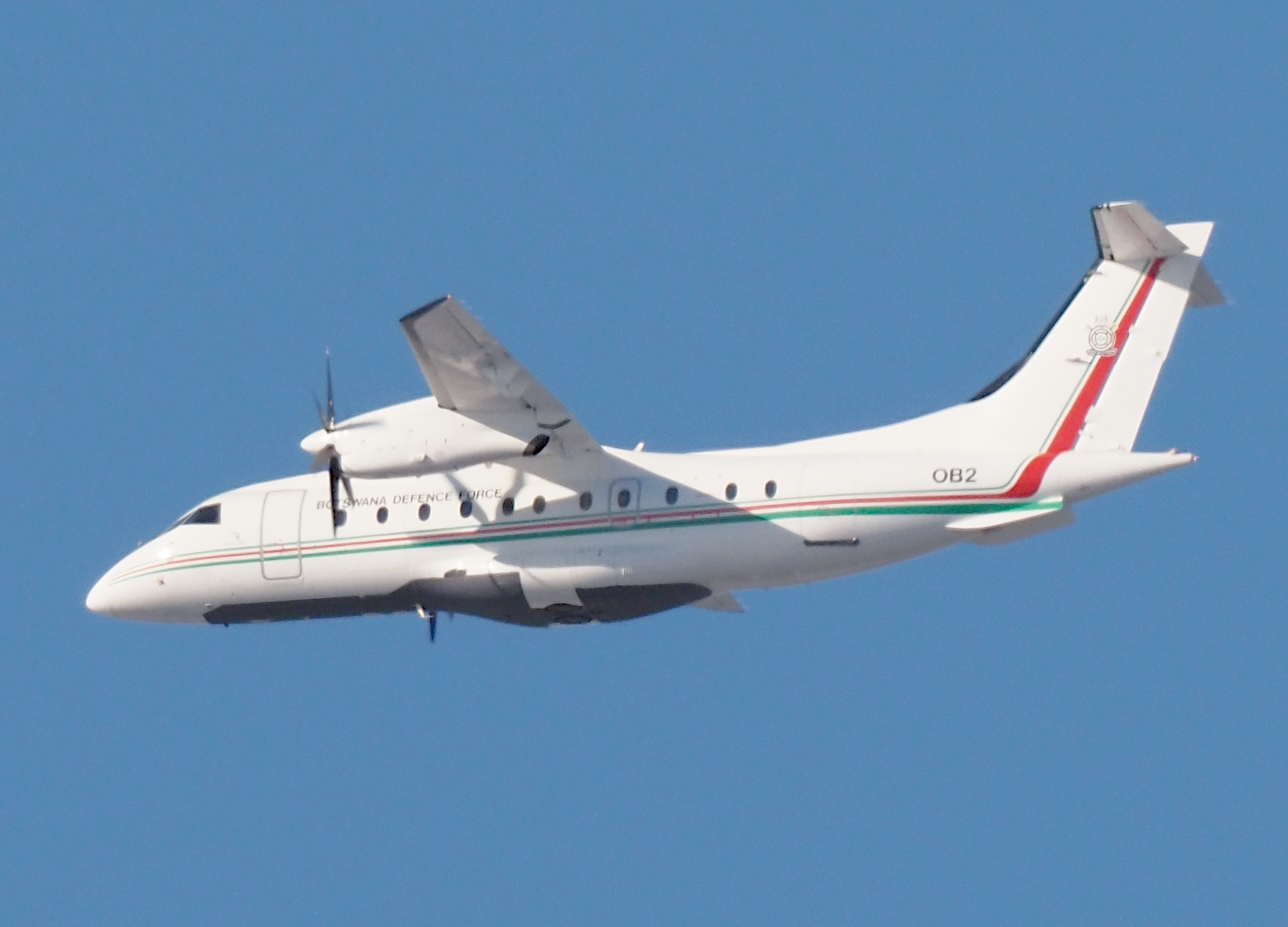
Dornier Do-328-110 OB2 Botswana Defence Force

Aircraft	Origin	Type	Variant	In service	Notes
Combat aircraft
Canadair CF-5	Canada	Fighter	CF-5A	10	Improved license-built variant of the Northrop F-5. Former RCAF aircraft.
Transport
Lockheed C-130 Hercules	United States	Transport	C-130H	1	Former USAF aircraft.
CASA C212	Spain	Transport		3	STOL capable aircraft
CASA/IPTN CN-235	Indonesia / Spain	Transport		2	
Beechcraft Super King Air	United States	Transport	200	1	
Britten-Norman BN-2	United Kingdom	Utility		2	
Dornier 328	Germany	Transport		1	
Bombardier Global Express	Canada	VIP transport	Global 5000	1	
Helicopters
Bell 412	United States	Utility		6	
Eurocopter AS350	France	Liaison / Utility		10	
AW 189	Italy	Utility			1 on order.
Trainer aircraft
Canadair CF-5	Canada	Conversion trainer	CF-5D	5	Improved license-built variant of the Northrop F-5. Former RCAF aircraft.
Pilatus PC-7	Switzerland	Trainer	Mk II	5	

=== Retired aircraft ===
Previous aircraft operated by the Air Force were the Gulfstream IV, Cessna 150, Cessna O-2 Skymaster, Britten-Norman BN-2 Islander, Pilatus PC-7 (original variant), Scottish Aviation Bulldog, and Short Skyvan.

=== Future acquisitions ===
The Botswana Air Arm Command has been considering a replacement for the BF-5 since 2013, due to the fact that the Canadair CF-5s are old, built in the 1970s, and are increasingly hard to maintain and to find spare parts for them. A report in 2013 by the then head of the BDF's air arm, Major General Odirile Mashinyana, recognized the need to replace the aircraft, but also advised that upgrading the BF-5s would allow time to save funds for a well chosen successor.

Since that time, the KAI T-50 Golden Eagle, used versions of the F-16, and the Saab Gripen were all considered. The most recent potential replacement was the Hindustan Aeronautics Limited-made HAL Tejas fighter, however as of January 2025, the Tejas is no longer being considered.

== Ranks ==
=== Commissioned officer ranks ===
The rank insignia of commissioned officers.

Rank group	General / flag officers		Senior officers			Junior officers
Botswana Defence Force Air Wing
Botswana Defence Force Air Wing	Major general	Brigadier	Colonel	Lieutenant colonel	Major	Captain	First lieutenant	Second lieutenant

=== Other ranks ===
The rank insignia of non-commissioned officers and enlisted personnel.

Rank group	Senior NCOs				Junior NCOs		Enlisted
Botswana Defence Force Air Wing							No insignia
Botswana Defence Force Air Wing	Warrant officer class 1	Warrant officer class 2	Staff sergeant	Sergeant	Corporal	Lance corporal	Private (or equivalent)
