= Turkish Stars =

- Türk Yıldızları
- Turkish Stars emblem
- Active: 7 November 1992
- Country: Turkey
- Branch: Turkish Air Force
- Role: Aerobatic demonstration Team
- Size: 7 Pilots, 6 Public affairs, 38 Maintenance personnel
- Garrison/HQ: Konya Air Base
- Mottos: A perfect harmony of skill, speed and discipline...
- Colors: Red; White; Grey

Commanders
- Current commander: Lt. Col. Hasan Kocabaş

Aircraft flown
- Fighter: 7 NF-5A Freedom Fighter; 6 NF-5B Freedom Fighter
- Transport: 1 C-130; 1 CASA/IPTN CN-235

The Turkish Stars (Turkish: Türk Yıldızları) are the aerobatic demonstration team of the Turkish Air Force and the national aerobatics team of Turkey.

The Turkish Stars is the seventh and final aerobatic team established under the Turkish Air Force. The team was formed on 7 November 1992. The Turkish Stars are stationed at the 3rd Main Jet Base Command. The official name of the squadron is 134th Aerobatic Squadron Command. The Turkish Stars operate with NF-5A/B aircraft. The team's motto is "A perfect harmony of skill, speed, and discipline."

When the Turkish Stars were first established, they started with four aircraft, increased to six aircraft in 1994, 7 aircraft in 1995, and reached eight aircraft in 2004. The future aircraft for the Turkish Stars is planned to be the TAI Hürjet.

On 24 August 2001, the Turkish Stars demonstrated at an airshow to more than one million people in Baku, Azerbaijan, setting a world record.

As of October 2026, Lt. Col. Hasan Kocabaş serve as fleet commander of Turkish Stars.

== History ==
An official decree was issued on 7 November 1992, for the establishment of the team, and training began on 25 December 1992, with four NF-5 aircraft. The "Turkish Stars" is also one of the few teams in the world that performs aerobatic demonstrations with supersonic aircraft. The aerobatic team, named the "Turkish Stars", performed its first show on 18 June 1993, with four NF-5A/B Freedom Fighter aircraft at the 4th Main Jet Base Command in the Akıncı region of Ankara. The Turkish Stars were introduced to the Turkish public on 5 October 1994, during the Republic Day celebrations at the 8th Main Jet Base Command in Diyarbakır. The team's 100th performance was held on 29 October 2000, during Republic Day celebrations at the Atatürk Cultural Center in Ankara.

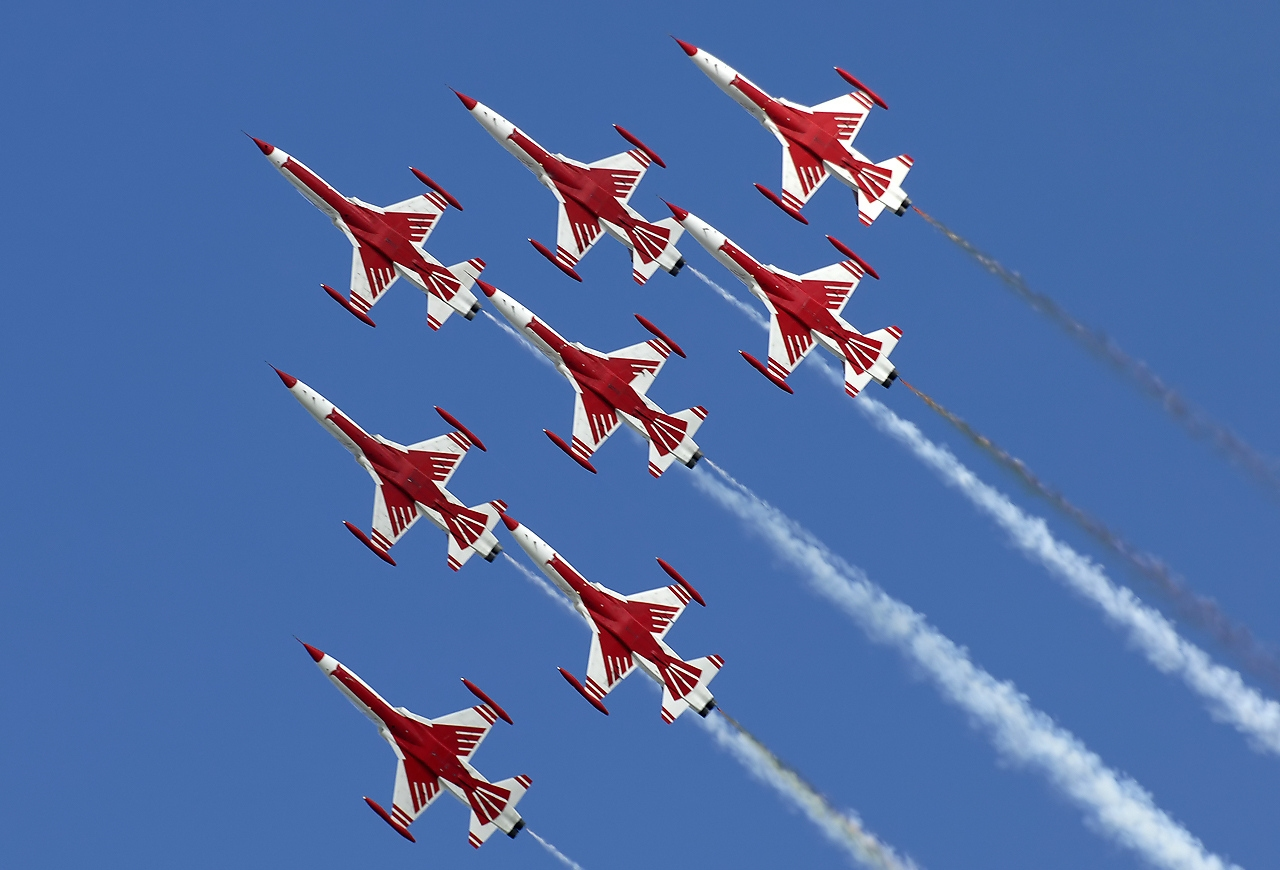
Turkish Stars's NF-5A aircraft holds a demonstration at Kecskemét Air Base, Hungary, 2010

On 24 August 2001, the Turkish Stars set a world record by performing an airshow in Baku, Azerbaijan, for over one million people.

== Aircraft ==
The NF-5 aircraft used by the Turkish Stars (Türk Yıldızları) were first introduced into the Turkish Air Force inventory in 1987. These aircraft were an excellent choice for aerobatic performances due to their flight systems and performance, especially when compared to other aircraft of the time. In fact, according to global aviation literature, the design of the F-5 family is considered one of the most ideal designs for supersonic jet flights.

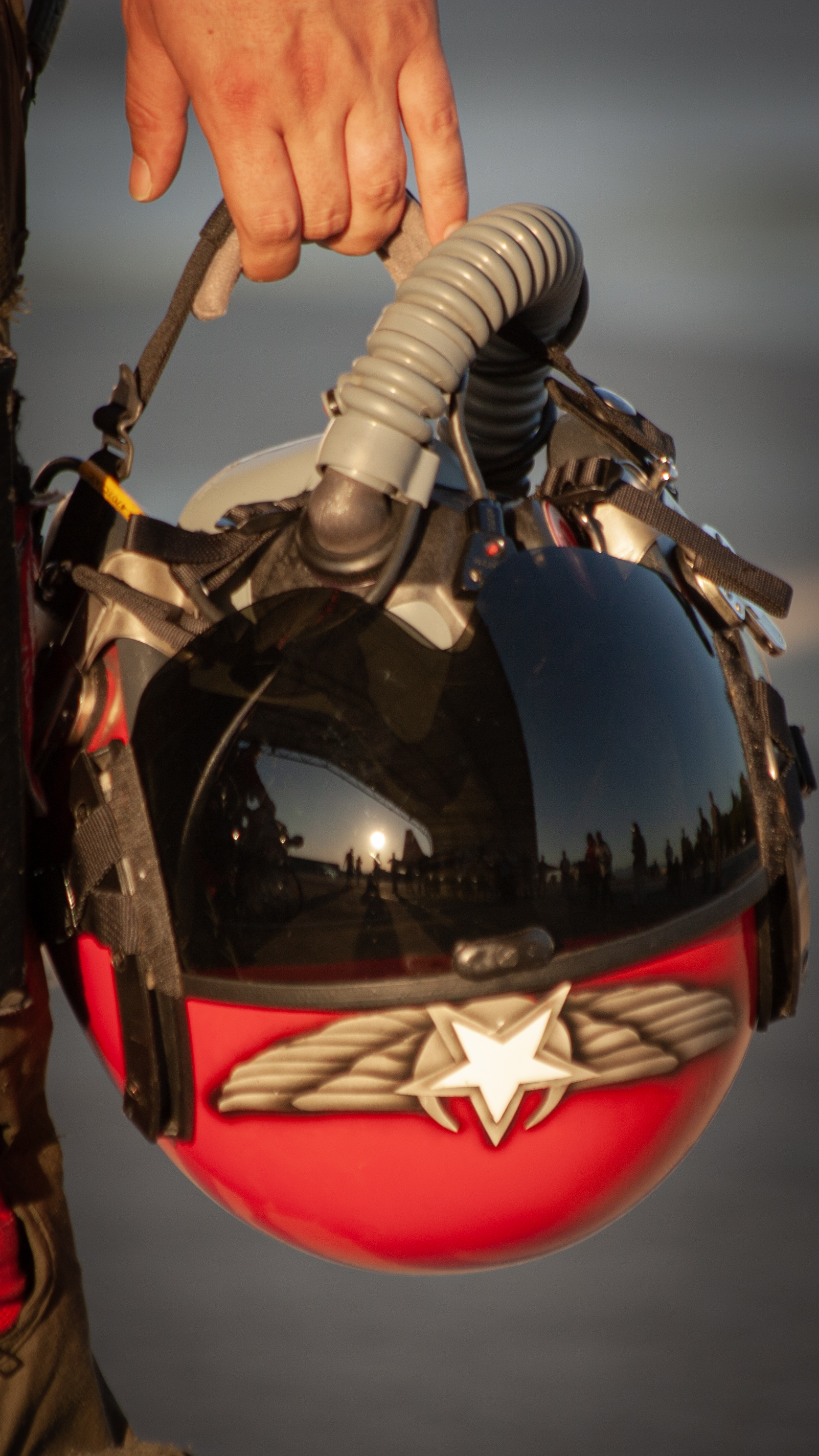
Turkish Stars after sunset flight

In 1993, a modification project was initiated at the 1st Air Supply Maintenance Center Command in Eskişehir, which focused on transforming the NF-5s to further enhance their capabilities for aerobatic displays. Several important changes were made to the aircraft, making them even more suitable for show performances:

- The chaff, flare units used for combat purposes, and the gun barrels located at the nose of the aircraft were removed and deactivated. Structural improvements were then made in these areas.
- The cockpit was redesigned to enhance visibility and ease of use. The mirrors in the cockpit were replaced with new ones, and their number was increased. This change made it easier for pilots to establish visual contact with aircraft on their wing during performances.
- To enable the aircraft to produce smoke during displays, the fuel tanks on the wingtips, known as "tip tanks", were disconnected from the other fuel tanks. Hydraulic pumps were added to these tanks. Through this system, colored paint placed in the tip tanks was pumped into the exhaust area, creating smoke effects due to the heat of the exhaust. Pilots activate this system using a trigger on the joystick. These modernization changes were completed in 1994, and the aircraft were delivered to the Turkish Stars fleet.
- Until 2012, the Turkish Stars' aircraft flew with their old livery, but since 2012, they have flown with a new livery, introduced in the 20th anniversary year of the Turkish Stars.

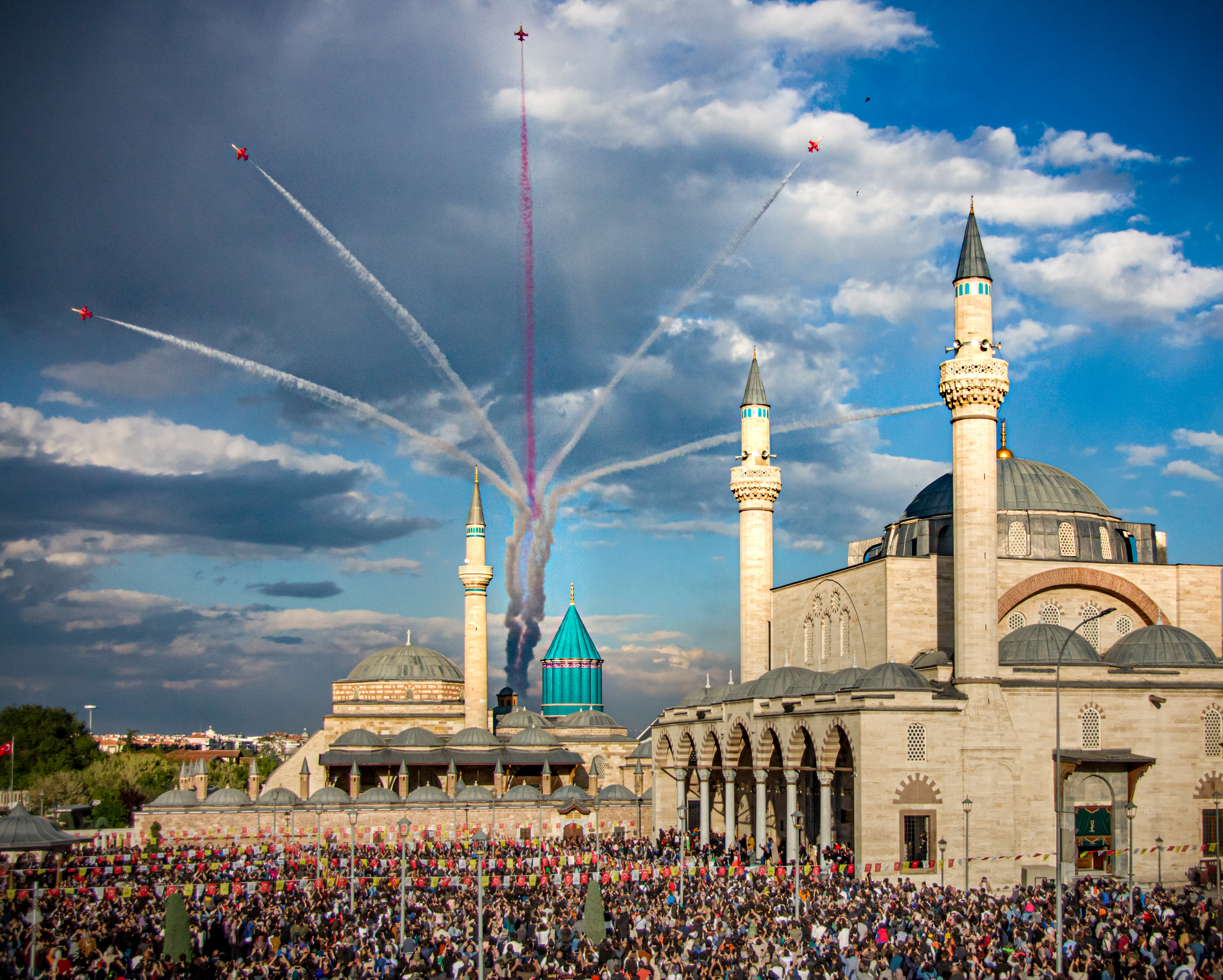
Turkish Stars over Mevlana Museum, Konya

To make training and display flights more efficient and to simplify flight evaluations, a three-axis VTR (camera recording system) was added to the Turkish Stars' aircraft in 2000. Currently, the Turkish Stars fleet consists of seven NF-5A 2000 (single-seat) and six NF-5B 2000 (double-seat) aircraft.

== Team Members ==
- #1 Lt. Col. Hasan KOCABAŞ - Flight Leader / Commanding Officer
- #2 Maj. Sertan AKKOÇ - Right Wing
- #3 1st Lt. Mehmet Cihad KARADUTLU - Left Wing
- #4 Maj. Mehmet KILIÇ - Slot
- #5 Maj. Sami YALÇIN - Opposing Solo
- #6 Maj. Alim KOCAMAN - Solo Leader
- 1st Lt. Ahmed Berkalp BİLGİ - Training
- 1st Lt. Ali Osman ERKOÇ - Training
- 1st Lt. Fatih SAĞLAM - Narrator
- CMSgt. Şahin DEMİRCİ
- CMSgt. İbrahim GENÇ
- SMSgt. Nejdet ADAK
- TSgt. Ramazan GÖZ
- TSgt. Emre KILIÇ
- TSgt. Kutay ÇETİN
- SSgt. Osman UNGUNEL

== Flight performance limits ==
The Turkish Stars shows consist of three main performance packages: High, Low and Flat Demo Package. These packages define different flight levels and types of maneuvers used in air demonstrations.

- High Demo Package: Performed when the cloud base is at least +9,000 feet (approximately 3,000 meters) above ground level.
- Low Demo Package: Performed when the cloud base is at least +4,000 feet (approximately 1,300 meters) above ground level.
- Flat Demo Package: Performed when the cloud base is at least +1,000 feet (approximately 300 meters) above ground level.

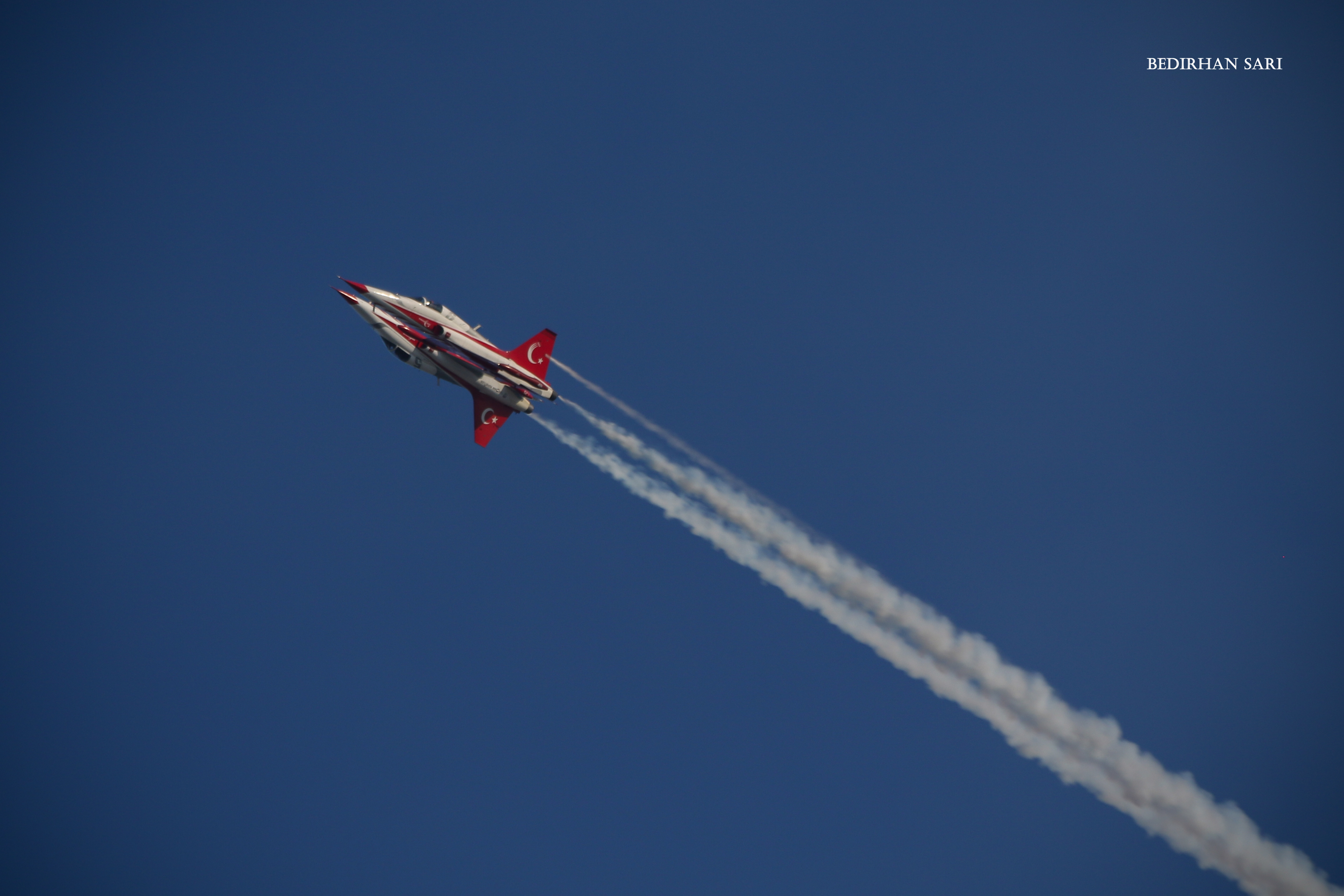
Turkish Stars Solo Numbers

In the High and Low Demo Packages, dynamic maneuvers involving formation and solo performances are demonstrated, while in the Flat Demo Package, transitions in various formation patterns are performed. During these shows, the distance between two aircraft can often come as close as 1 meter. In these types of displays, pilots experience forces ranging from around 5.5 to 6g in formation maneuvers and from -3G to +7.3G in solo flights, which are the aircraft's limits. The speed of flights during Turkish Stars' performances ranges from 200 knots (approximately 370 km/h) to 520 knots (approximately 960 km/h). These maneuvers are performed entirely manually with pilots relying on their psychomotor skills including hand, foot and eye coordination.

== Incidents ==
On 13 March 2012, one of the team's NF-5 fighters crashed during a training session in Konya Province, 2 km (1.2 mi) from the airbase where the team is stationed. Pilot Flight lieutenant Ümit Özer, who had joined the Turkish Stars shortly before, died in the crash.

On 7 April 2021, an NF-5 fighter plane crashed during a training session near Karatay. Pilot Flight lieutenant Burak Gençcelep died in the crash.

On 6 December 2022, during a training flight, an NF-5 collided with a bird causing engine failure. The pilot ejected and was confirmed to be unharmed.

On 14 March 2024, during a training flight, an NF-5 crashed into a construction site near the runway during a landing attempt, killing one construction worker who was operating construction equipment. The pilot successfully ejected and was airlifted by helicopter to the Selçuk University Faculty of Medicine. The Turkish Ministry of National Defence official Twitter account announced that the crash occurred at 12:51 pm Local Time and the cause was unknown. It also announced that an investigation had been initiated.
