= Air Force Heritage Museum and Air Park =

Air Force museum in St. James (Winnipeg), Manitoba

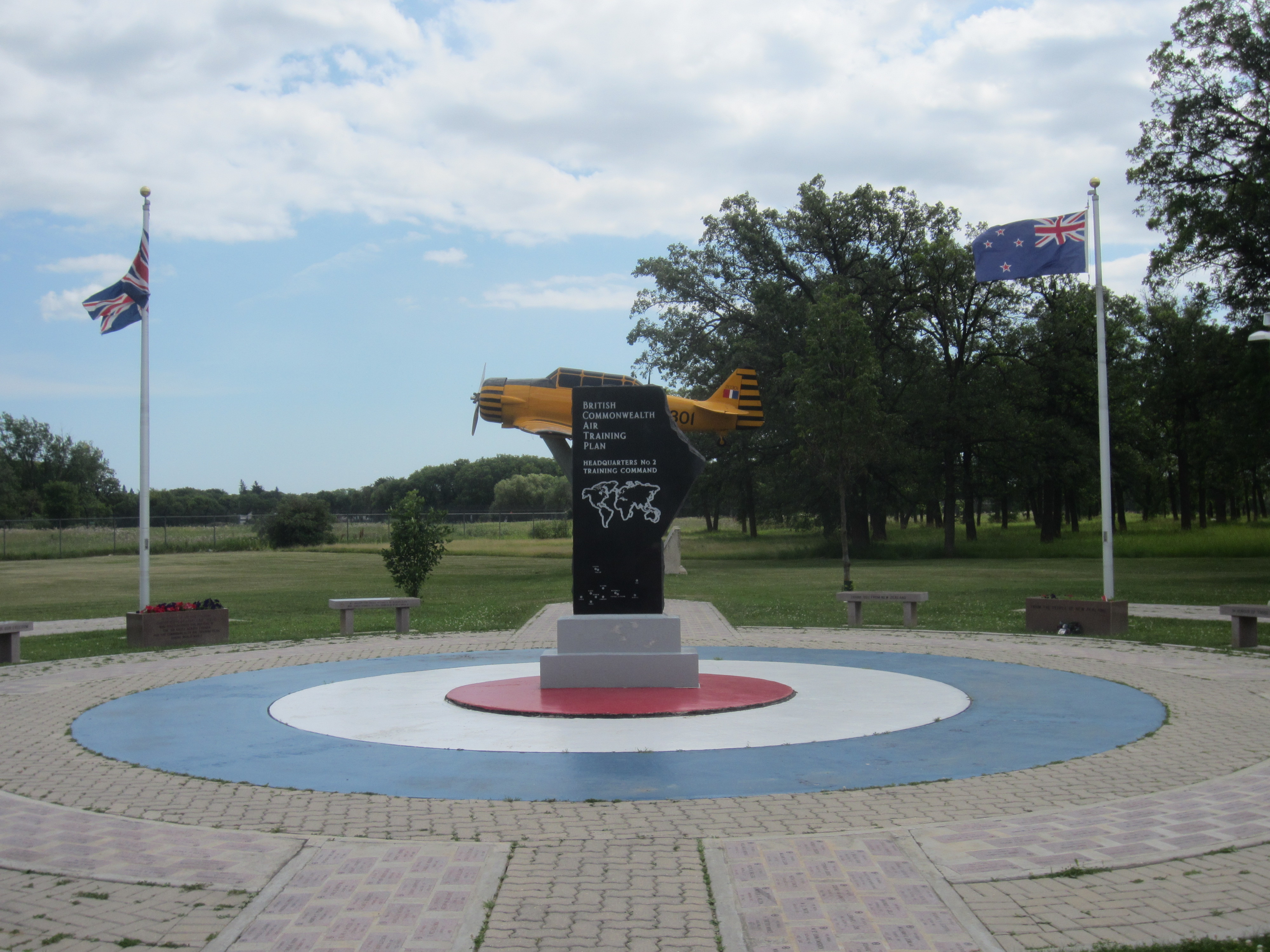
- British Commonwealth Air Training memorial at the Air Park
- Established: 1975; 51 years ago
- Location: 17 Wing
- Coordinates: 49°53′24.36″N 97°14′10.68″W
- Type: Air museum
- Public transit access: 24 Ness Express; 83 Unicity - Strauss Drive - Murray Industrial Park

The Air Force Heritage Museum and Air Park, in Winnipeg, Manitoba displays aircraft and artifacts pertaining to the history of the Royal Canadian Air Force. The park contains memorials to Canadian air search and rescue, to aircraft maintenance personnel, and to the people who trained under the British Commonwealth Air Training Plan. The museum was established in 1975. Memorials in the park were dedicated in 1999.

The air park has a large permanent display of Canadian military aircraft on the ground and mounted on pedestals. The indoor portion in the Bishop Building of 1 Canadian Air Division has artifacts such as aviation art, displays highlighting the seven Victoria Crosses awarded to Canadian Airmen, including the posthumous awards to Andrew Mynarski and David Hornell, and one of the remaining Battle of Britain lace tapestries.

== Collection ==
Outside on static display are:

- Avro Canada CF-100 Canuck 100784
- Beechcraft CT-134 Musketeer 134228
- Bell CH-136 Kiowa 136248
- Canadair CF-5A 116749
- Canadair CX-144 Challenger 144612
- Canadair CL-13B Sabre 23605
- Canadair CT-133 Silver Star 133186
- Grumman CP-121 Tracker 1551
- Canadair CF-104 Starfighter 104753
- McDonnell CF-101 Voodoo 101008
- North American Harvard (Canada Car and Foundry Mk IV) 20301

Inside the base, on static display are:

- North American B-25 Mitchell 5203
- Douglas Dakota Mk. 4SC 12949
- Beechcraft D18S Expeditor 1528

On loan to the Royal Aviation Museum of Western Canada

- Canadair CT-114 Tutor 114004
- de Havilland Canada CC-115 Buffalo 115462

The park also displays the antenna from an AN/FPS 508 search radar from the Pinetree Line.

== See also ==
- List of aviation museums
