= No. 9 Squadron RSAF =

- Active: 1970s-present
- Country: Saudi Arabia
- Branch: Royal Saudi Air Force
- Type: Squadron
- Role: Training
- Part of: RSAF 1 Wing
- Base: King Faisal Air Academy, Majmaah
- Aircraft: Pilatus PC-21

No. 9 Squadron RSAF is a squadron of the Royal Saudi Air Force that operates the Pilatus PC-21 at the King Faisal Air Academy, Majmaah, Riyadh Province in Saudi Arabia as part of RSAF 1 Wing.

It used to fly the BAC Strikemaster Mk. 80 at Riyadh.
