= Thebephatshwa Airport =

Airport in Botswana

- IATA: none; ICAO: FBTP

Summary
- Airport type: Military
- Owner: Botswana Defence Force
- Serves: Molepolole
- Elevation AMSL: 3,750 ft (1,140 m)
- Coordinates: 24°13′15″S 25°20′55″E

Map
- Location of Thebephatshwa Airport in Botswana

Runways
Direction	Length		Surface
Direction	m	ft	Surface
08/26	3,002	9,849	Asphalt/concrete
08L/26R	2,007	6,585	Asphalt/concrete
- Source: Landings.com Google Maps GCM

Thebephatshwa Airport (ICAO: FBTP) is an airport serving Molepolole, in the Kweneng District of Botswana. The airport is 24 kilometres (15 mi) northwest of Molepolole.

== Maparangwane Air Base ==
The main base has a hangar for larger aircraft and helicopter hangar located to the northeast end of the runway.

The airport also serves as one of three Botswana Defence Force Air Wing air bases. The air base is home to:

- Z1 Transport Squadron
- Z7 Training Squadron
- Z10 Transport Squadron
- Z21 Transport/Helicopter Squadron
- Z23 Transport/Helicopter Squadron
- Z28 Fighter Squadron

The airbase is also home to the Thebephatshwa Airbase Hospital, with two helipads.

== See also ==
- Transport in Botswana
- List of airports in Botswana
