= FAAC Incorporated =

American immersive simulation training company

- Type: Private
- Industry: Defense Hardware/Software Simulation Training
- Founded: 1971; 55 years ago
- Headquarters: Ann Arbor, Michigan, United States
- Key people: Kurt A. Flosky, President; Christopher J. Caruana, Executive Vice President; Christopher Garvey, CFO
- Website: http://www.faac.com/

FAAC Incorporated is an American immersive simulation training company. They began as a military contractor, providing flight and weapons simulation systems to the U.S. Air Force, and playing a role in Distributed Interactive Simulation standards development. Today they supply training simulators for transit and transportation, law enforcement, Fire/EMS, research, and human-interaction simulation.

FAAC is most notable for their advancements in simulation systems for mass transit and public safety training. FAAC developed the first immersive bus transit training simulator (in 1999). In 2015 this simulator was named among the top 100 safety improvements of the last 150 years by the APTA. FAAC also introduced the first full-mission CGI-based light rail train (LRT) simulator, the first interactive full-cab immersive tractor-trailer truck simulators, and the first fully interactive simulators for Fire/EMS responders.

== History ==
FAAC was founded in 1971. That same year, they delivered weapon simulations systems for the first simulation-based U.S. military air combat training systems, (e.g., the U.S. Air Force’s Air Combat Maneuvering Instrumentation (ACMI) system, and the Navy’s Air Combat Maneuvering Range (ACMR) and Tactical Air Crew Training System (TACTS)). Soon after they were chosen to be the sole simulation software development provider for U.S. military integrated air defense systems (IADS) simulations. They retained this exclusive role through the 1990s and have since continued to provide systems and services to many branches of the military.

Through a series of strategic partnerships and acquisitions FAAC expanded into different aspects of vehicle, environmental, and human-interaction simulation and training. Important acquisitions included IES Interactive Training (developer of the MILO Range tactical engagement simulation system for law enforcement) and Realtime Technologies (research simulation for automotive vehicles). They were themselves acquired by Arotech Corporation in 2004. These partnerships and acquisitions brought together otherwise disparate elements of hardware/software simulation design and implementation, leading to several decades of simulation training advancement (i.e., interactive full-cab immersive tractor-trailer truck simulators, U.S. military interactive driving simulators with motion cuing, and fully interactive simulators for U.S. Fire/EMS responders).

== Advancements in Public Safety Training ==
FAAC is especially noted for hardware/software advancements in immersive law enforcement simulation training systems. In 1995 they released the first all-digital tactical engagement simulation (TES) systems for law enforcement. Over subsequent generations, these became the first such systems to include integrated debriefing and end-user-accessible scenario authoring tools, and to integrate police driving pursuit training, force options, weapons training, communication skills, and deescalation strategies into a continuous simulation exercise. Significant hardware advancements include adding true multi-DoF (degrees of freedom) motion seats to police driving simulators, live point-of-view adjustment via real-time motion-capture (accomplished using off-the-shelf consumer-grade Microsoft Kinect™ hardware), true recoil firearm simulation, wireless haptic feedback distraction devices, and biometric tracking. Such hardware advancements are important, as they trigger the stress-related physiological changes that occur in the human body during emergencies, and which may negatively impact officer judgement. This creates a more authentic training environment for public safety officers. This has been accomplished both through changes in training curricula/simulation content, as well as through improved hardware/software integrations.

FAAC is a founding member of Pursuit Response, an advisory group composed of industry and victim’s advocacy groups, and dedicated to improving law enforcement/community safety during high-risk vehicle events.
