= Maple Flag =

Royal Canadian Air Force annual exercise

- Cold Lake, Alberta

Site information
- Controlled by: Royal Canadian Air Force

Location
- Shown in Canada
- Coordinates: 54°24′18″N 110°16′46″W

Exercise Maple Flag is an annual air combat exercise carried out from CFB Cold Lake over the co-located Cold Lake Air Weapons Range (CLAWR). It is among the largest such exercises in the world, lasting four weeks, split into two two-week "phases". The first Maple Flag was carried out in 1978, initially twice a year, but moved to an annual format in 1987.

Maple Flag provides realistic training for pilots from the Royal Canadian Air Force (RCAF), as well as select allied air forces from around the world. The number of personnel at CFB Cold Lake effectively doubles while the exercise is being conducted, with approximately 5,000 pilots and support crews participating.

== History ==
Maple Flag can be considered a Canadian version of the United States Air Force's Red Flag, which is held several times a year at Nellis Air Force Base (using the Nellis Air Force Range). RED FLAG was conceived during the Vietnam War when the USAF found that 90 percent of combat aircraft losses were during a pilot's first 10 missions; the first RED FLAG occurred in 1975. Initially conceived as Exercise RED FLAG NORTH in 1977, it was renamed Exercise MAPLE FLAG in 1978.

Maple Flag copied the Red Flag format in 1978 and until 1987, it was held twice a year, and reduced to once a year after 1987. Maple Flag has been cancelled three times between 1991 and 2011 all due to significant RCAF commitments, once in 1991, due to the Gulf War, and again in 1999 due to combat operations (Operation Allied Force) in Kosovo. In 2011, Maple Flag was cancelled due to NATO military commitments (Operation Mobile) in Libya.

Maple Flag was again cancelled in 2015 due to Operation Impact (Canadian Armed Forces (CAF) mission to degrade and ultimately defeat Daesh in Iraq and Syria) and Operation Reassurance (CAF mission to Central and Eastern Europe to provide assurance and deterrence measures for NATO countries in the region).

The RCAF decided to not conduct Maple Flag in 2019. The RCAF will use the opportunity to modernize the infrastructure used during the exercise and to re-focus its resources to update the exercise's mandate. To ensure that Maple Flag remains relevant now and into the future.

== Exercise format ==
The mission of MAPLE FLAG is to provide training to the Canadian Forces and allied air forces, including fighter, bomber, aerial refuelling, transport, air defence, AWACS, SEAD, and electronic warfare crews.

Participants join forces against a hostile aggressor (called "Redland"), using the Cold Lake Air Weapons Range (CLAWR) territory for all operations. CLAWR is 1.17 million hectares in size and is approximately 70 kilometers north of 4 Wing Cold Lake.

Each 10-day phase involves a combination of air-to-ground, air-to-air and other missions twice a day, morning and afternoon. The Air Force Tactical Training Centre (AFTTC), located at 4 Wing CFB Cold Lake, plans, directs and hosts Exercise Maple Flag. Fighter aircraft carry Air Combat Maneuvering Instrumentation (ACMI) pods to simulate air-to-air and air-to-surface attacks.

== Aggressors ==
Played by various aircraft including frequently F-16Cs from United States Air Force's 64th Aggressor Squadron. On 31 October 2017 Discovery Air Defence had won the Contracted Airborne Training Services (CATS), a ten-year contract to provide "Aggressor" aircraft to play red hostile forces during Canadian military exercises. Discovery Air Defence use a fleet of modernized Alpha Jets to simulate red opposition forces.

== International Observer Program ==
The International Observer Program provides potential future participants of Exercise MAPLE FLAG the opportunity to experience the exercise up close, without committing large amounts of resources. The aim of this program is to secure other nations' future participation in Exercise MAPLE FLAG. Participants have come from a variety of allied and partner nations, including: Australia, Chile, Germany, India, Israel, Philippines, Oman, Peru, Kingdom of Saudi Arabia, South Africa, Republic of South Korea and Sweden.

== Exercise participants ==
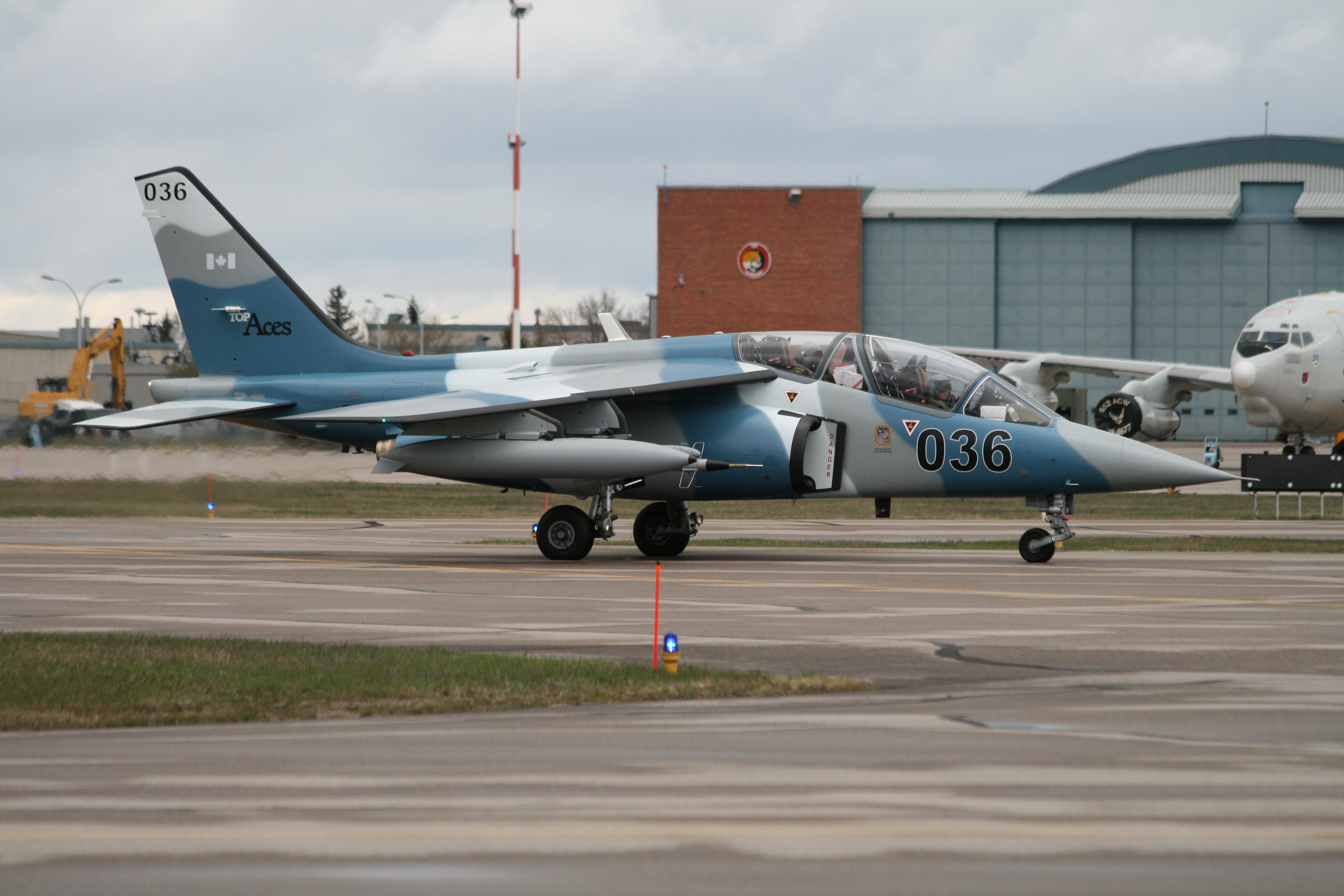
"Aggressor" Alpha Jet participating in MAPLE FLAG

Most Canadian tactical combat aircrew have participated in MAPLE FLAG over the years, initially flying the CF-104 Starfighter, CF-101 Voodoo and CF-116 Freedom Fighter, followed by the CF-18 Hornet. Other supporting aircraft have included the CC-177, Canadair CT-133 T-bird, CT-114 Tutor, CC-130 Hercules, CP-140 Aurora, CH-146 Griffon, CT-155 Hawk, CT-156 Harvard II, CC-150 Polaris and the CC-137 Husky.

Allied air forces from many NATO countries have been involved in years past, with numerous aircraft types. Examples include:

- German Luftwaffe: F-4F Phantom II, C-160D Transall, MiG-29G, Panavia Tornado
- Royal Air Force: Buccaneer, Harrier GR3, Harrier II, SEPECAT Jaguar, C-130, Panavia Tornado, Sentry AEW.1
- USAF/USN/USMC – F-16C/D Fighting Falcon, F-15 Eagle, F-15E Strike Eagle, A-10 Thunderbolt, EA-6B Prowler, B-1B Lancer, KC-135 Stratotanker, KC-10 Extender, C-5 Galaxy, C-141 Starlifter, C-17 Globemaster III, F/A-18E Super Hornet, F/A-18A/B/C/D Hornets, F-111 Aardvark, A-7D Corsair
- Royal Netherlands Air Force: F-16AMLU Fighting Falcon
- French Armée de l'Air: C-160R, Mirage 2000-N, Mirage 2000-D, Mirage 2000-5, Mirage F1CT, Boeing E-3 Sentry, A400M
- Royal Norwegian Air Force – F-16 Fighting Falcon
- Belgian Air Force – F-16MLU, C-130H Hercules

Non-NATO nations include:

- Israeli Air Force: F-16C/D
- Royal Australian Air Force: F/A-18A/B Hornet, C-130H Hercules
- Royal New Zealand Air Force: C-130H Hercules
- Swedish Air Force – C-130H Hercules (Pre-NATO)
- Republic of Singapore Air Force: KC-135R Stratotanker, F-16 Fighting Falcon
- Brazilian Air Force – C-130H Hercules
- Colombian Air Force – 6 A-29 Super Tucanos, 1 C-130H Hercules, and 1 KC-767MMTT.

Many officers and personnel from other nations have been invited as guests of the Canadian Forces to observe MAPLE FLAG operations. Several private sector organizations have also participated in MAPLE FLAG, providing fictional opposition Redland forces.

== Gallery ==
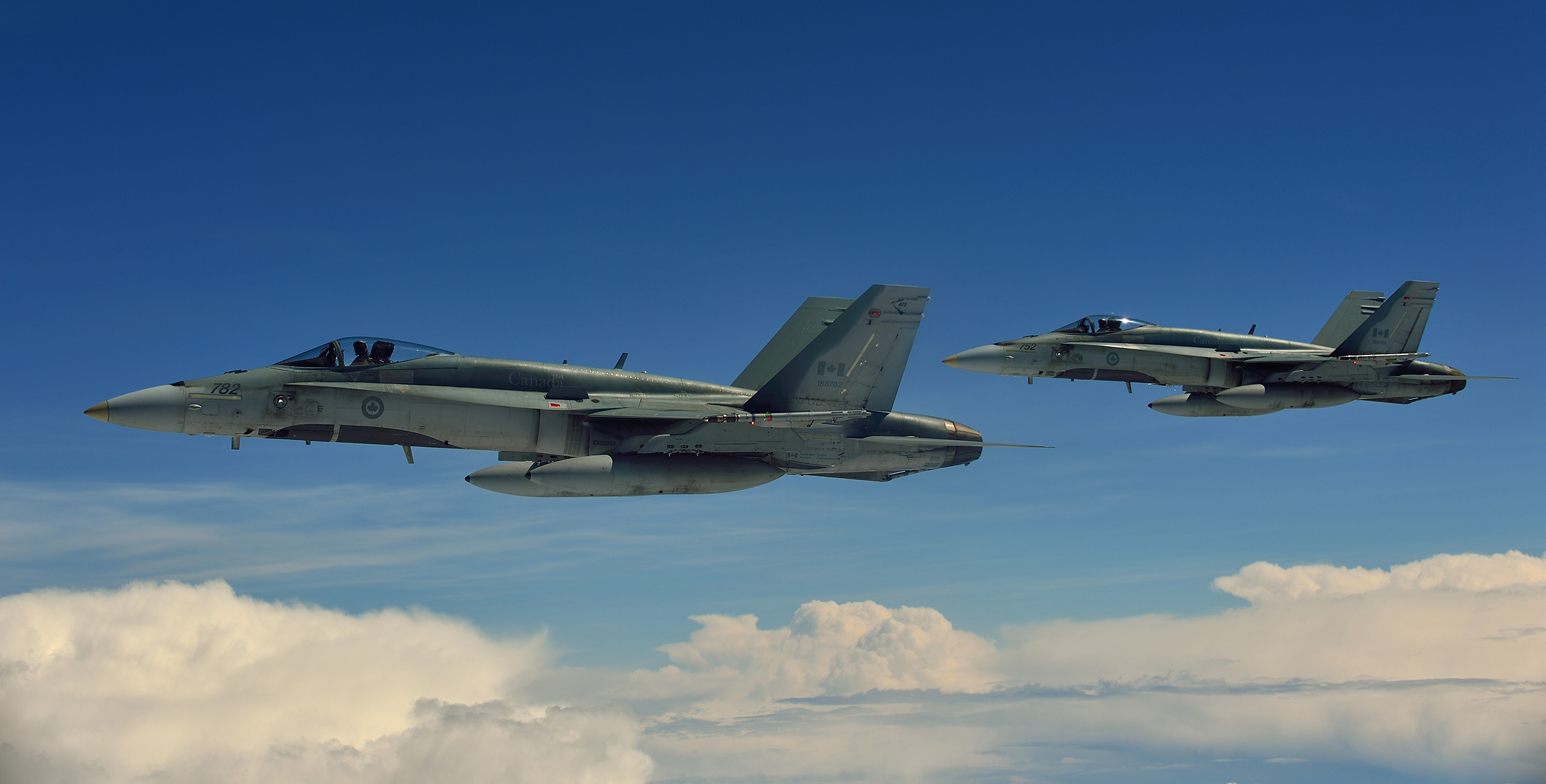
Two Royal Canadian Air Force CF-188 Hornets approach a Colombian A.F. KC-767 tanker

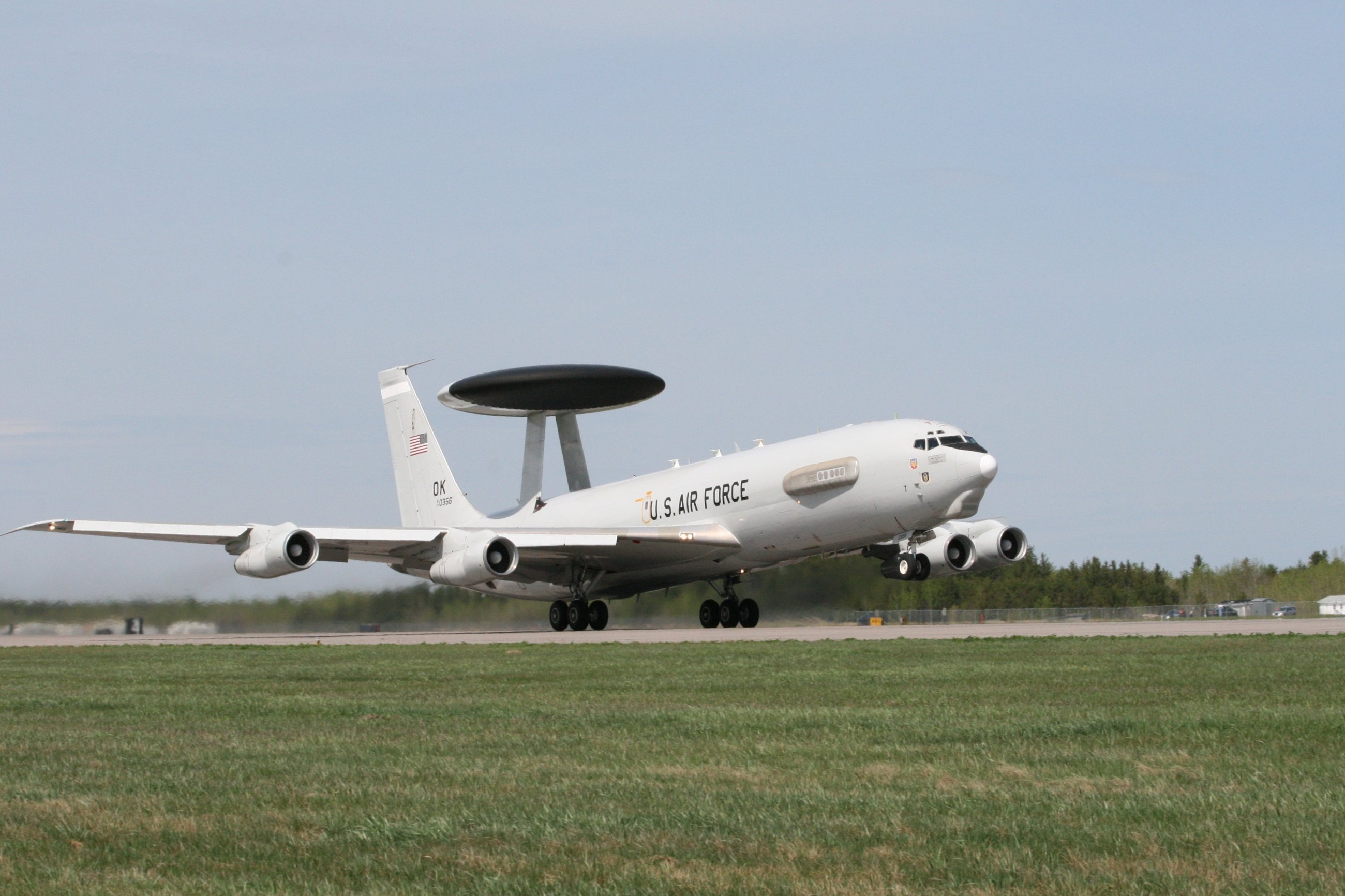
USAF Boeing E-3 takes off on a Maple Flag mission

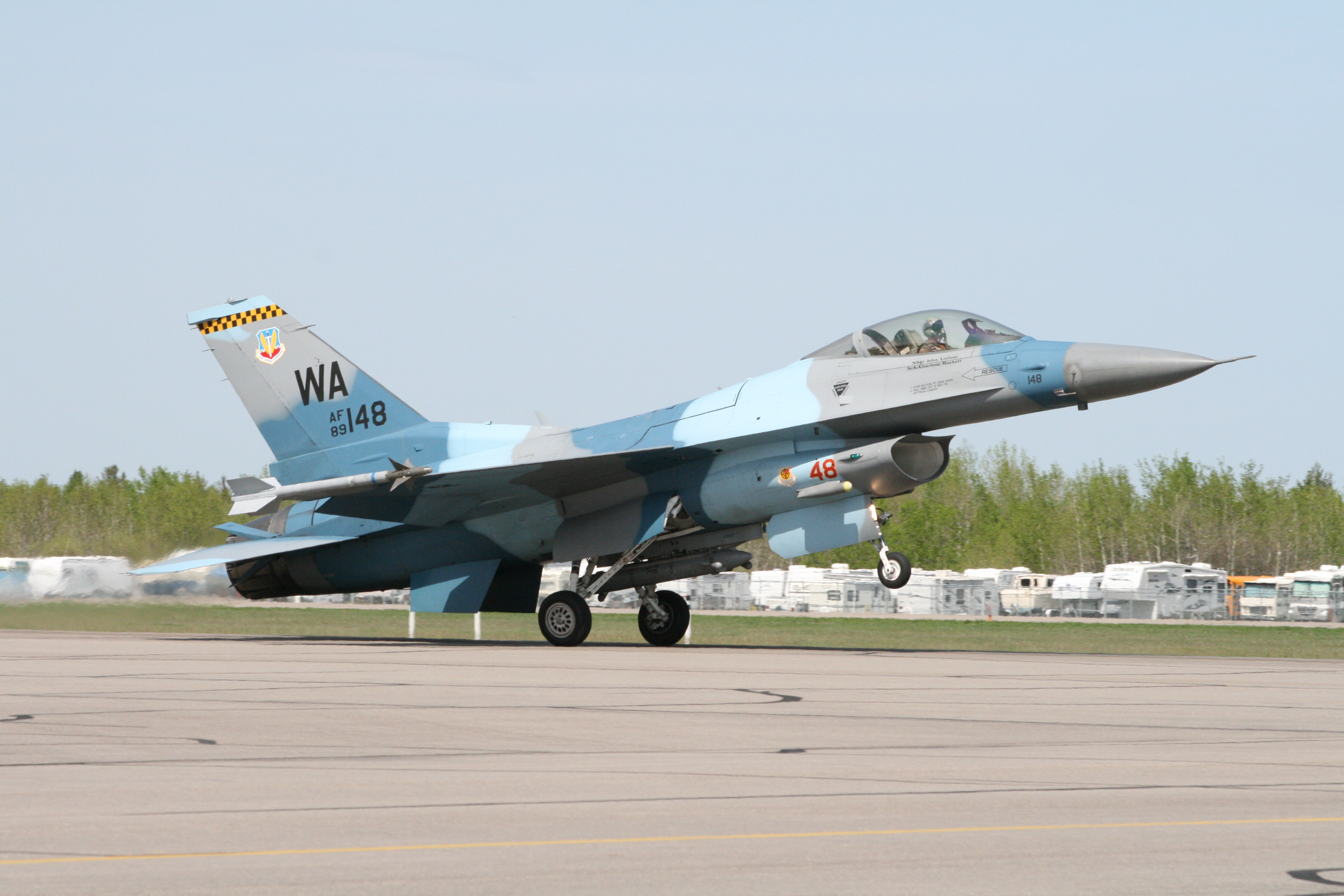
USAF 64th Aggressors F-16C gets airborne from CFB Cold Lake

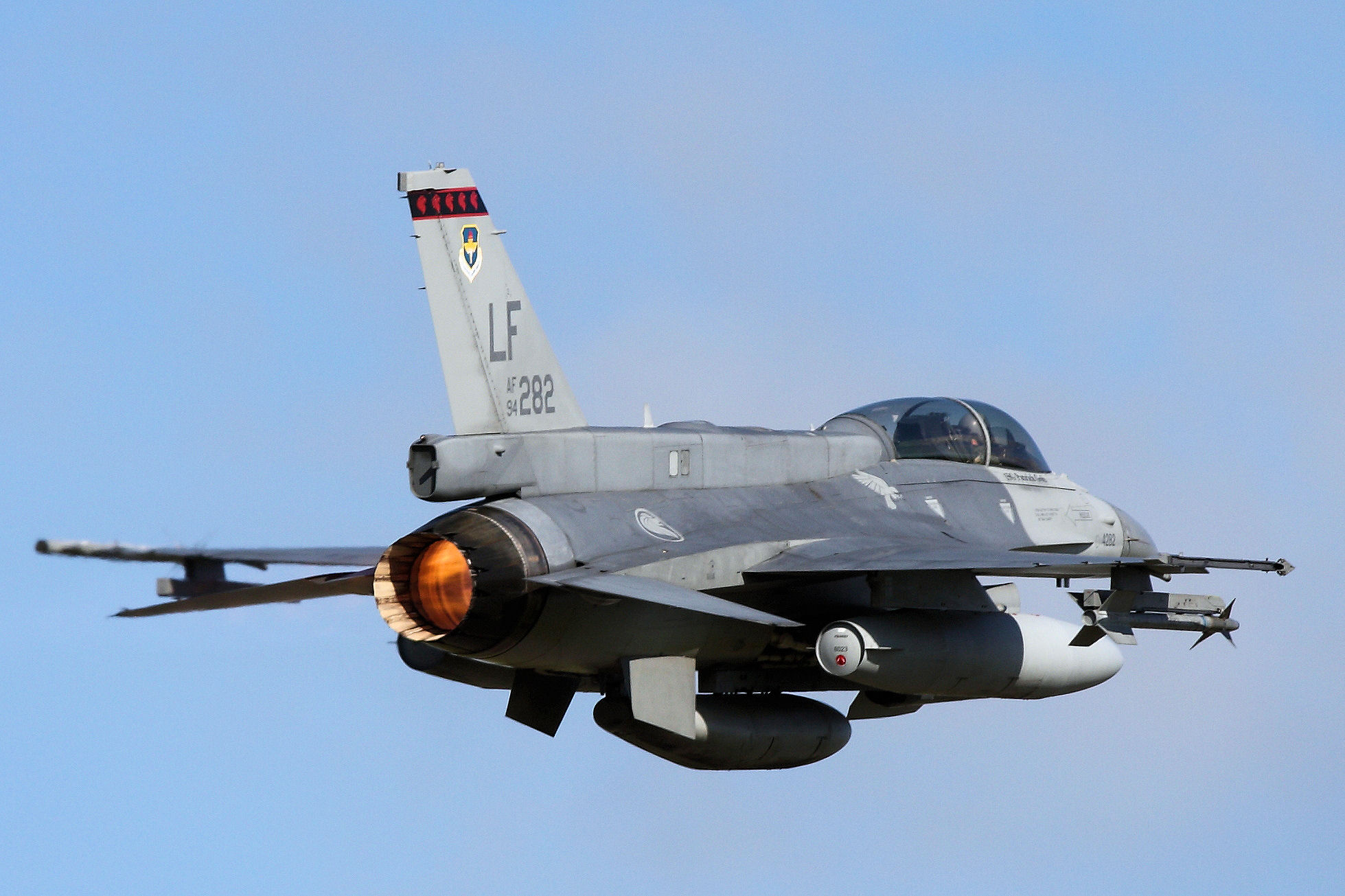
Republic of Singapore Air Force F-16D takes off during Maple Flag 2009

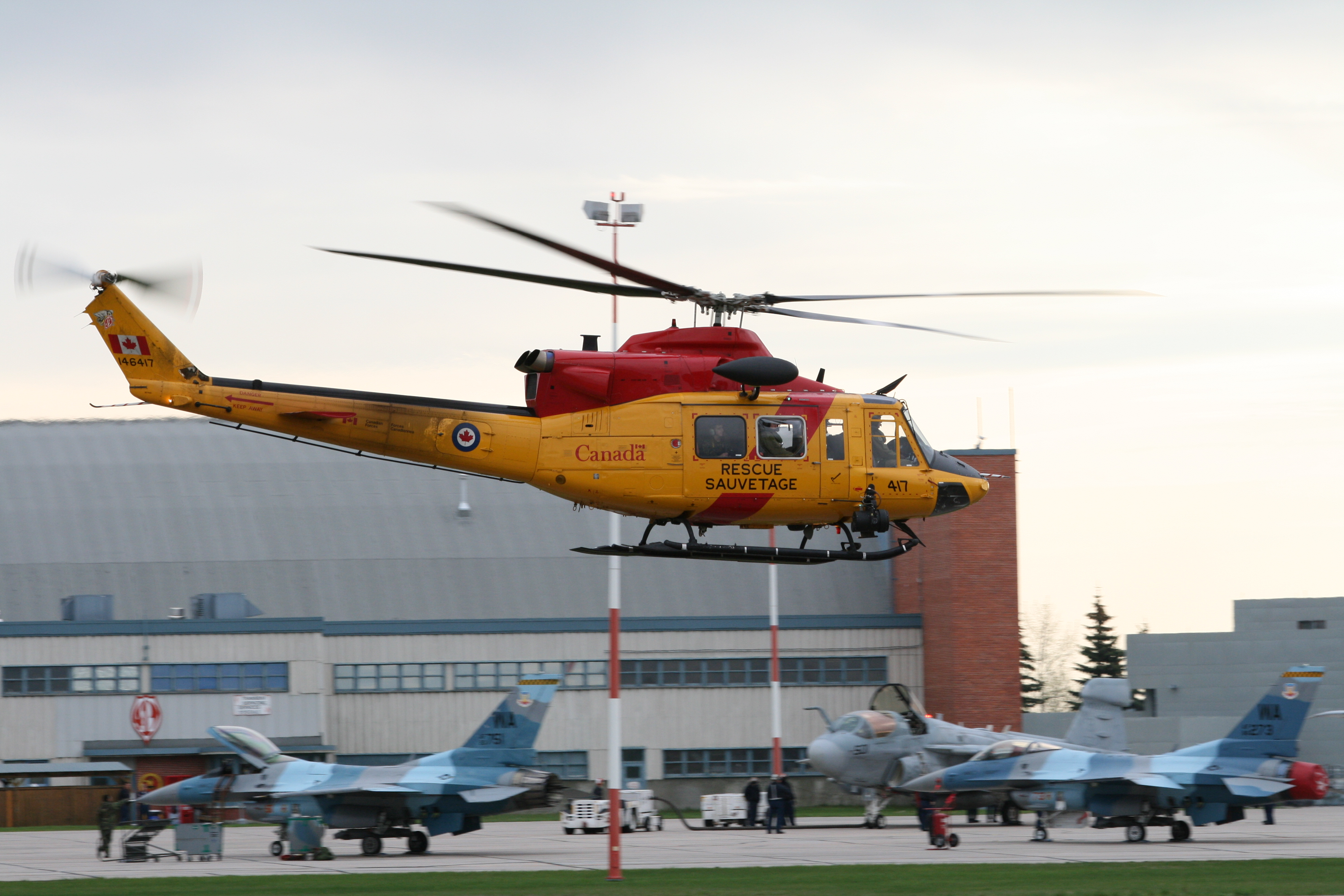
CH-146 Griffon takes off during the morning launch of Maple Flag 2008

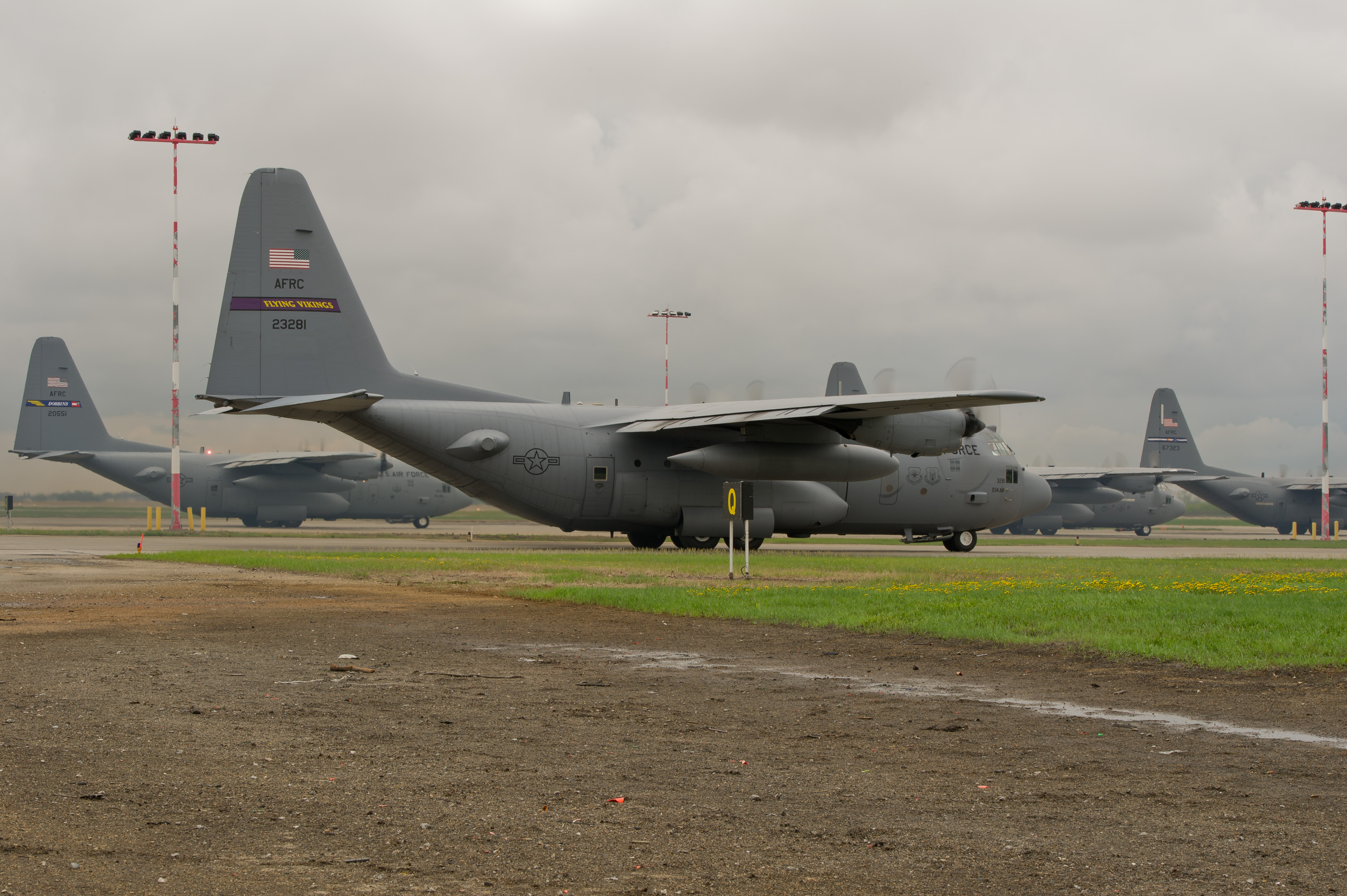
U.S. Air Force C-130 Hercules aircraft during Maple Flag 2014
