= AACMI =

ACMI may refer to:

- Autonomous Air Combat Manoeuvring Instrumentation
- Aircraft, Crew, Maintenance and Insurance
- Australian Centre for the Moving Image
