= 417 Combat Support Squadron =

Canadian military flying unit

- 417^{e} Escadron de soutien au combat (French)
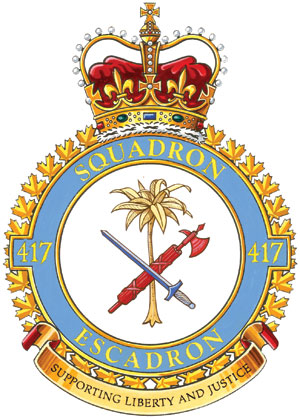
- Active: 1941–1945; 1947–1949; 1968–1983; 1993–present
- Country: Canada
- Branch: Royal Canadian Air Force
- Type: Combat support
- Role: Search and rescue
- Size: One squadron
- Part of: 4 Wing
- Garrison/HQ: CFB Cold Lake
- Mottos: Supporting liberty and justice
- Battle honours: Defence of Britain, 1942; Egypt and Libya, 1942–1943; North Africa, 1943; Sicily, 1943; Italy, 1943–1945; Salerno; Anzio and Nettuno; Gustav Line; Gothic Line
- Website: canada.ca/en/air-force/corporate/squadrons/417-squadron.html

Commanders
- Honorary colonel: Kendra Kincade

Insignia
- Identification symbol: Argent in front of a palm tree Or eradicated a sword Argent and fasces Gules in saltire

Aircraft flown
- Transport: CH-146 Griffon

417 Combat Support Squadron (French: 417^{e} Escadron de soutien au combat) is an Air Force unit with the Canadian Forces. Based at CFB Cold Lake it provides helicopter support to the base operations. Since 1994, it has also provided search and rescue.

== History ==
417 Squadron was a Royal Canadian Air Force squadron formed in England on 27 November 1941 at RAF Charmy Down and was known as the "City of Windsor" squadron. It was equipped with the Hurricane and later the Spitfire. It was initially deployed in Egypt and followed the Allied advance through the Western Desert. On 10 July 1943 when the Allies invaded Sicily (Operation Husky), the squadron was part of No. 244 Wing RAF in No. 211 Group RAF.

With the defeat of Axis forces in North Africa, the squadron followed the advance through Italy. It disbanded in Italy on 1 July 1945.

Windsor, Ontario, adopted the squadron in 1943, and members of the community sent packages and letters to the squadron's airmen for the rest of the war. The Windsor media nicknamed the squadron the "Windsor Spitfires", and in 1946 a junior hockey team was named the Windsor Spitfires.

The squadron reactivated in Canada on 1 June 1947, at Rivers, Manitoba. It was equipped with the North American P-51 Mustang for army close support training until 1 August 1948.

Re-formed as a part of the Canadian Forces in 1970 it operated as an operational training squadron on the Lockheed CF-104 Starfighter at CFB Cold Lake. The squadron disbanded in 1983 with the retirement of the CF-104 fleet.

On 1 April 1993, 417 Combat Support squadron was formed from CFB Cold Lake Base Flight plus aircraft servicing and maintenance elements of the Wing Maintenance organization. The squadron continued Base Flight's operations with ten Canadair CT-133 Silver Star and three CH-118 Iroquois. When Base Rescue Moose Jaw was disbanded in 1993, 417 Squadron gained two of their CH-118s, to operate a total of five.

In July 1995 417 Squadron received three CH-146 Griffon helicopters and the five CH-118s were retired. The CT-133 was retired in 2001.

== Images ==
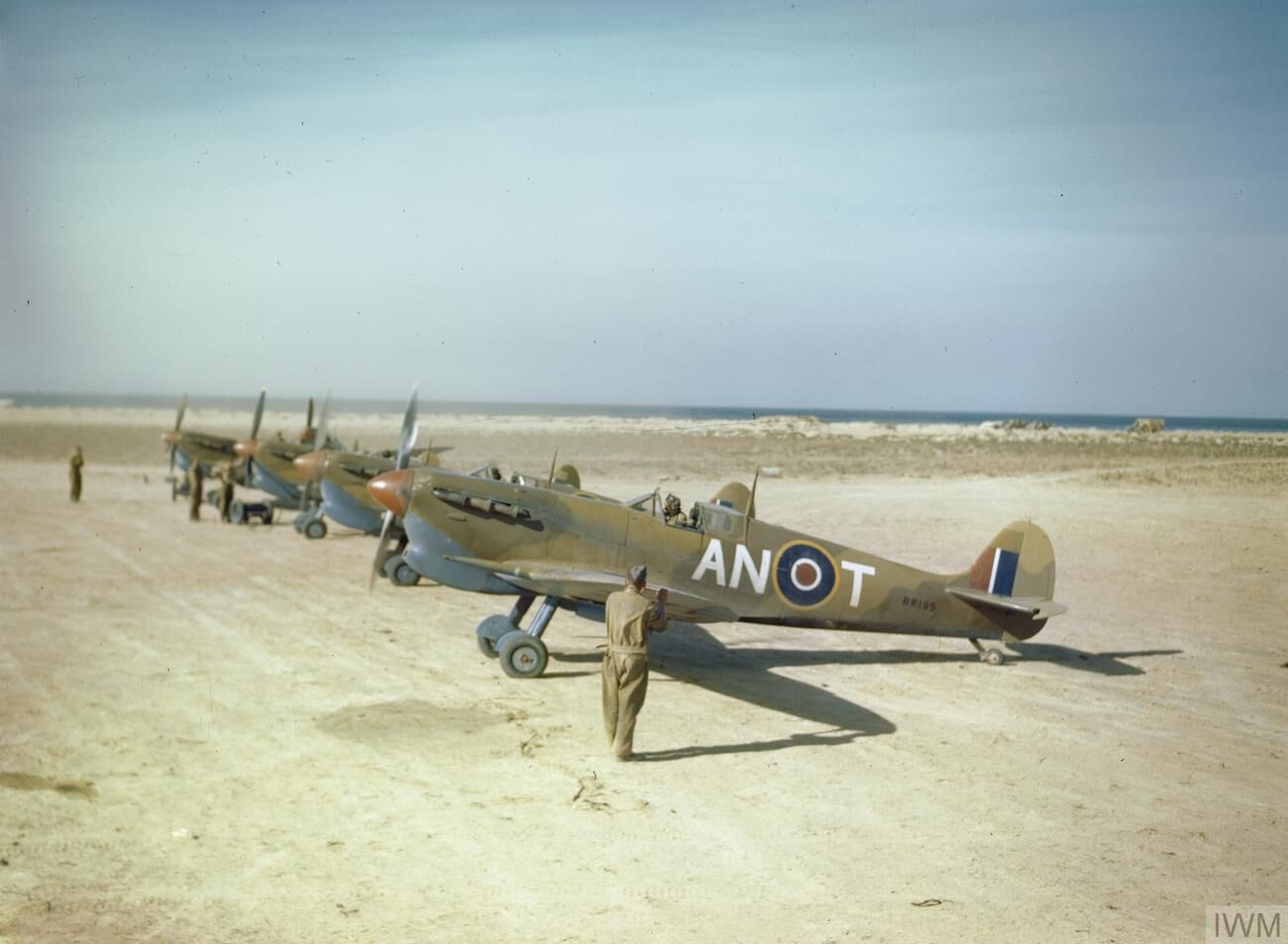
Mark VC Spitfires of No. 417 Squadron RCAF at Goubrine Airfield, Tunisia, May 1943.

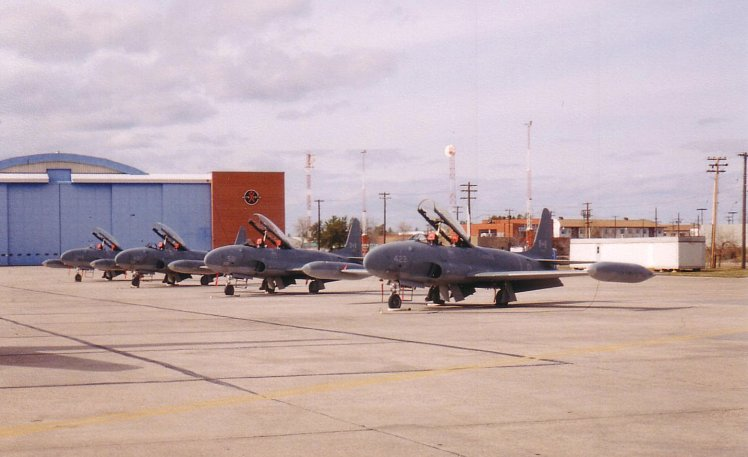
Canadair CT-133 Silver Stars from 417 (Combat Support) Squadron.

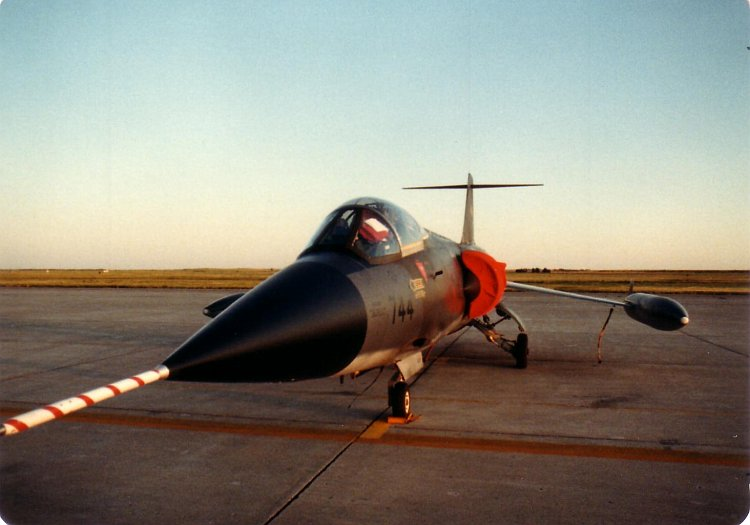
417 Operational Training Squadron CF-104 Starfighter on deployment to CFB Moose Jaw in 1982.

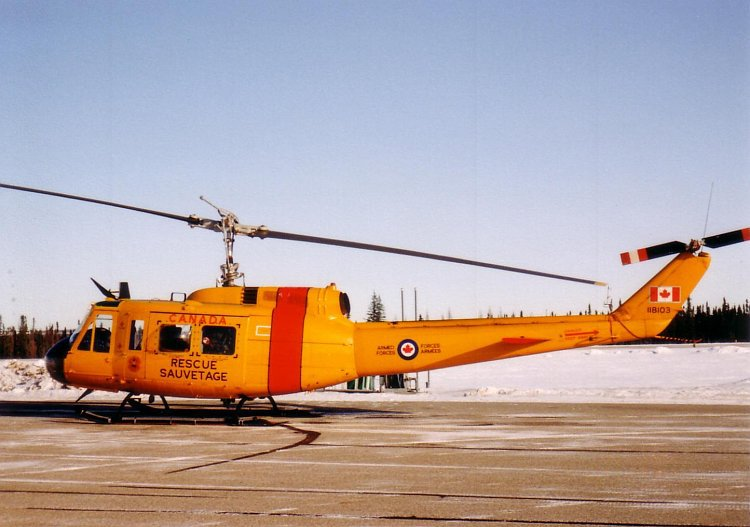
Base Flight Cold Lake CH-118 Iroquois helicopter 118103 at CFB Cold Lake, January 1992.

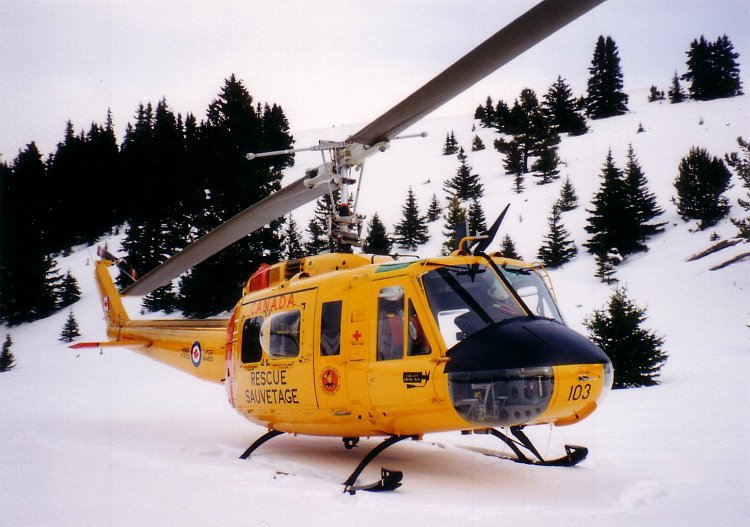
CH 118 Huey from 417 (Combat Support) Squadron.

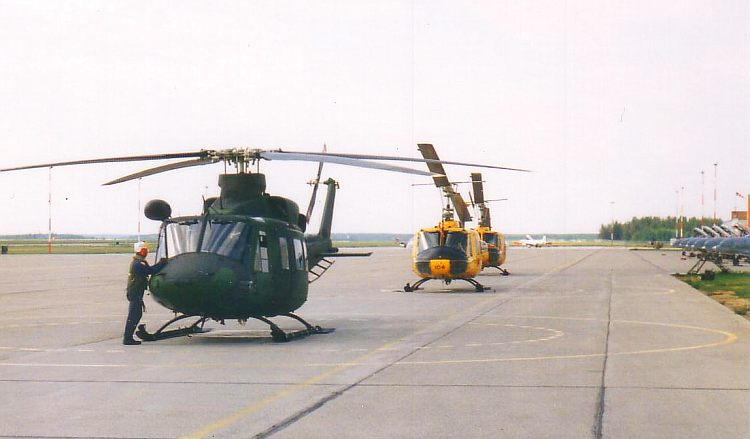
The first CH-146 Griffon arrives at 417 Sqn, on the flight line with the CH-118s it is to replace.

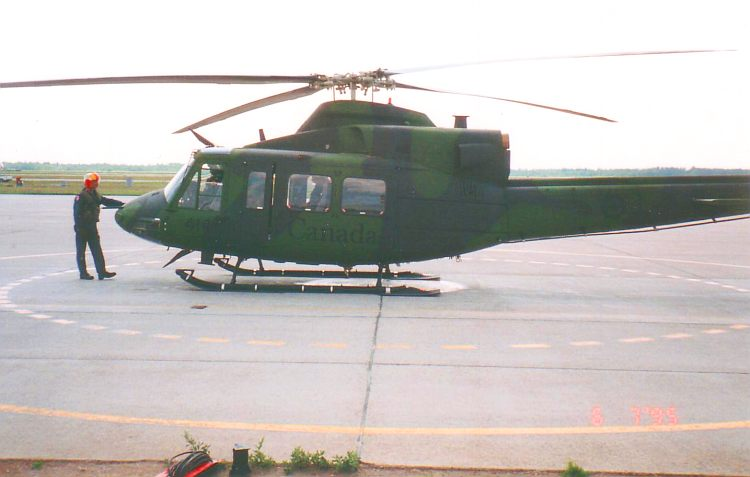
417 Sqn's first CH-146 Griffon, serial number 146414, arrived on 6 July 1995.

== Badges ==
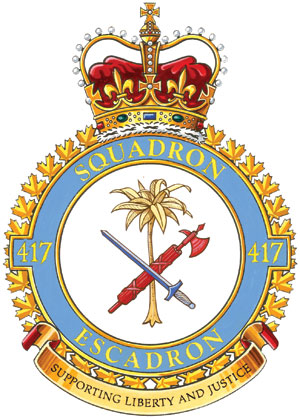
417 Combat Support Squadron official badge 1993

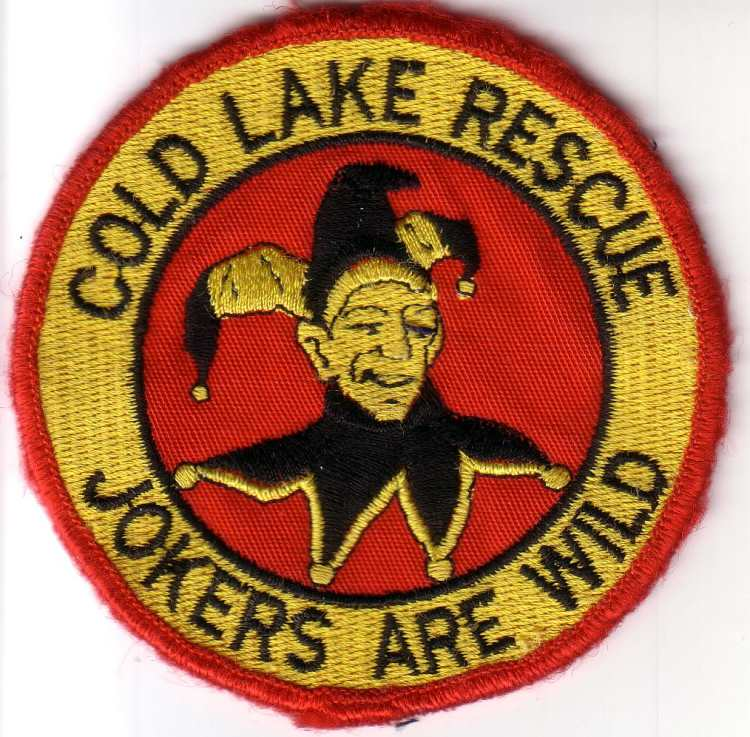
417 Combat Support Squadron Rescue Flight badge 1993

417 Combat Support Squadron T-33 Flight aircraft type badge 1993

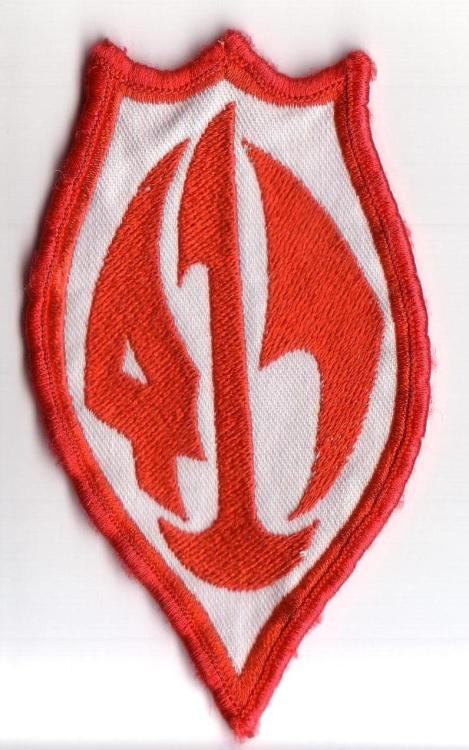
417 Combat Support Squadron unofficial badge worn by all members 1993

Base Flight Cold Lake badge 1990

== Cadets ==
417 Squadron is affiliated with 395 Edmonton "Griffon" Squadron Royal Canadian Air Cadets, in Edmonton, Alberta. This affiliation began in 1993, with annual "Griffon Coin Parades" being hosted every year between the two units.
