= Weapon effects simulation =

Creation of artificial weapons effects

Weapon Effects Simulation (WES) is the creation of artificial weapons effects such as flashes, bangs and smoke during military training exercises. It is used in combination with Tactical engagement simulation (TES), which uses laser projection for training purposes instead of bullets and missiles. Typically, an accurate laser "shot" hitting a target such as a tank, will trigger cartridge-based WES equipment fitted to the tank which will give a flash, bang and smoke, signifying a hit in the exercise scenario.

== See also ==
- Multiple integrated laser engagement system
