= Arotech Corporation =

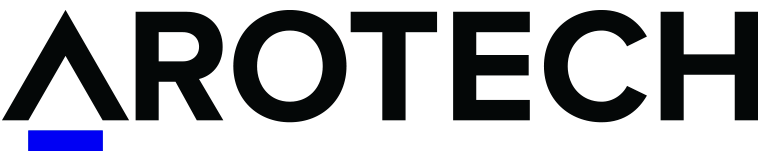
- Company type: Private
- Traded as: Nasdaq: ARTX
- Industry: Defense; Aerospace
- Founded: 1990; 36 years ago
- Headquarters: Delaware, United States
- Key people: Dean M. Krutty (CEO)
- Revenue: ▲US$ 98.7 million (2017)
- Operating income: ▲US$ 2.9 million (2017)
- Net income: ▲US$ 3.8 million (2017)
- Owner: Greenbriar Equity Group
- Number of employees: 472
- Website: arotech.com

Arotech Corporation is a defense and security products and services company. It manufactures and designs products for military and non-military air and ground vehicles; interactive simulation for military, law enforcement and commercial markets, and batteries and charging systems for the military. Arotech operates through two major business divisions: Interactive simulation for military, law enforcement and commercial markets, and batteries and power systems for the military.

Arotech is incorporated in Delaware, with corporate offices in Ann Arbor, Michigan and research, development and production subsidiaries in Michigan, South Carolina and Israel. Until late 2019 they were publicly held (NASDAQ: ARTX). In December 2019 Arotech was acquired by Greenbriar Equity Group and taken private.

Raytheon Company remains Arotech's chief competitor in defense, homeland security and other government markets.

== Armor Systems Division ==
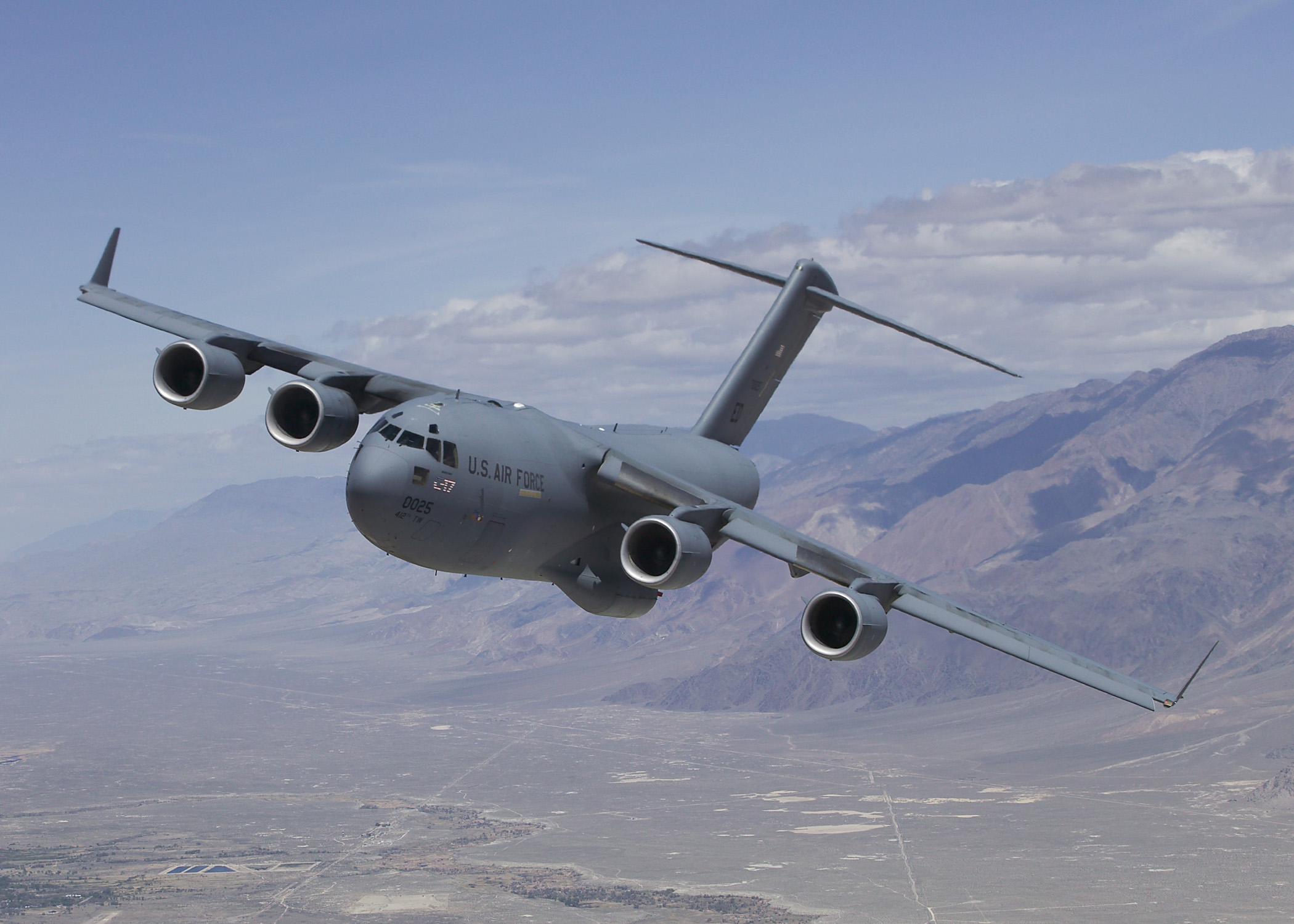
Arotech has provided protective armor for Boeing's C-17 Globemaster III

In 2004, Armour of America was acquired by Arotech Corporation. Arotech's armor division produces armored vehicles for homeland security and government agencies. It owns manufacturing facilities in Auburn, Alabama, and Lod, Israel. The company has designed armor for over 30 types of vehicles, including military vehicles, helicopters and transport aircraft. These include:

- Beechcraft Aircraft
- Boeing C-17
- Boeing CH-47
- Lockheed P-3
- Lockheed C-130
- Yunshuji Y-12
- Sikorsky UH-60 Blackhawk
- Bell 205
- Humvee
- Mil Mi-8
- M923

== Military training simulation programs ==
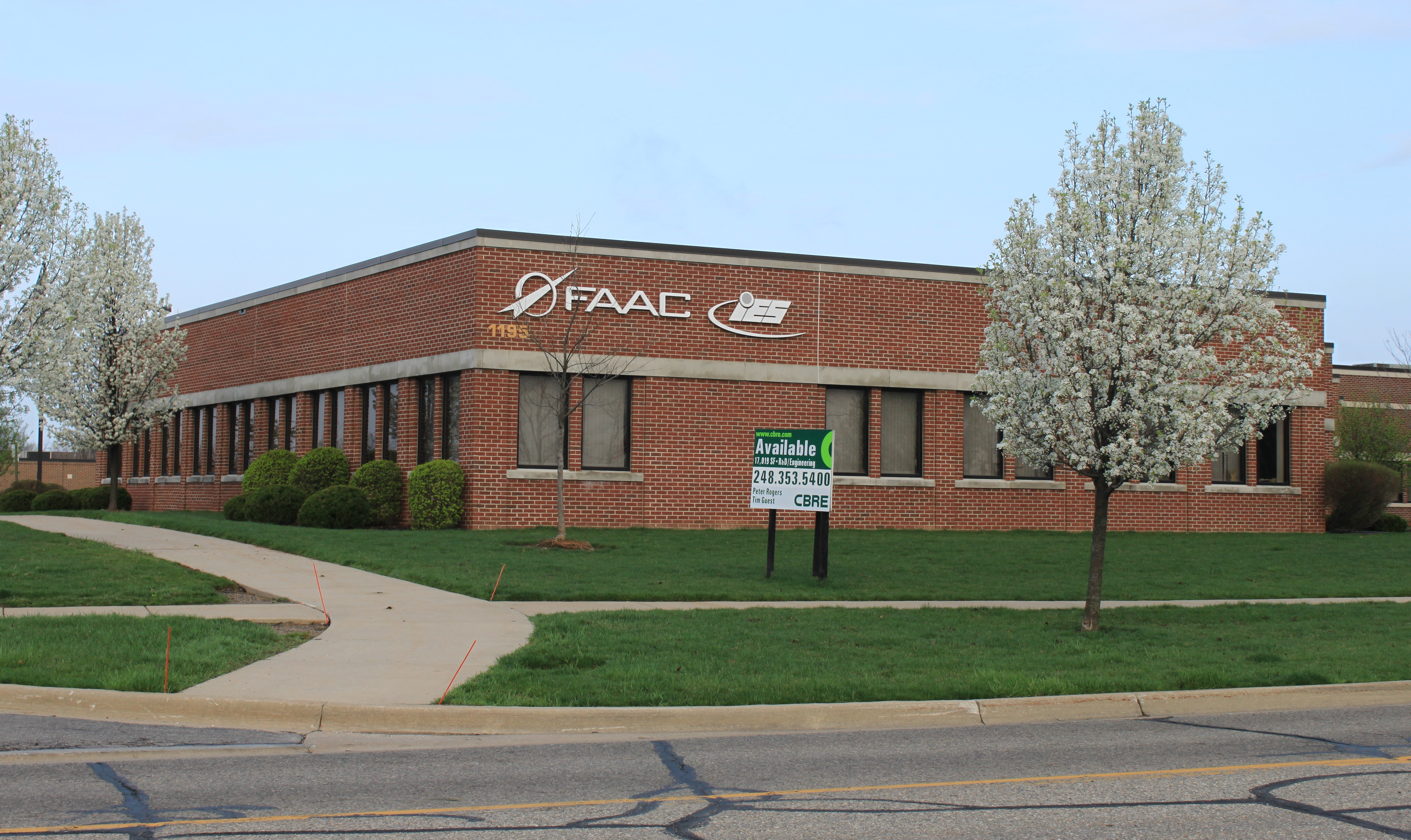
FAAC/IES corporate offices, Ann Arbor

Arotech's Training and Simulation Division (FAAC) manufactures and markets simulators for engineering, use-of-force, and driver training simulations for military, law enforcement, security, municipal and private industry personnel. The division also supplies pilot decision making support software for the F-15, F-16, F-18, F-22, and F-35 aircraft, as well as simulation models for the ACMI/TACTS air combat training ranges.

Arotech's simulation division has been awarded federal contracts for the Federal Bureau of Investigation (FBI), Drug Enforcement Administration (DEA), and Department of Health and Human Services (HHS).
