= Bell CH-146 Griffon =

Military utility helicopter

CH-146 Griffon
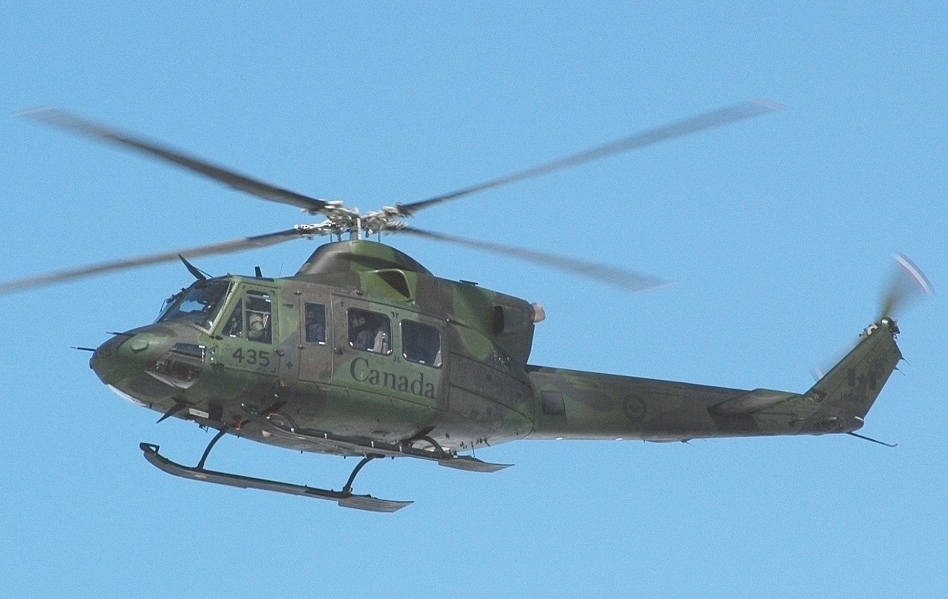
- A CH-146 Griffon from 430 Tactical Helicopter Squadron

General information
- Type: Utility helicopter
- National origin: United States / Canada
- Manufacturer: Bell Helicopter
- Status: In service
- Primary user: Royal Canadian Air Force
- Number built: 100 (85 in service)

History
- Manufactured: 1992–1997
- Introduction date: 1995
- First flight: 1992
- Developed from: Bell 412

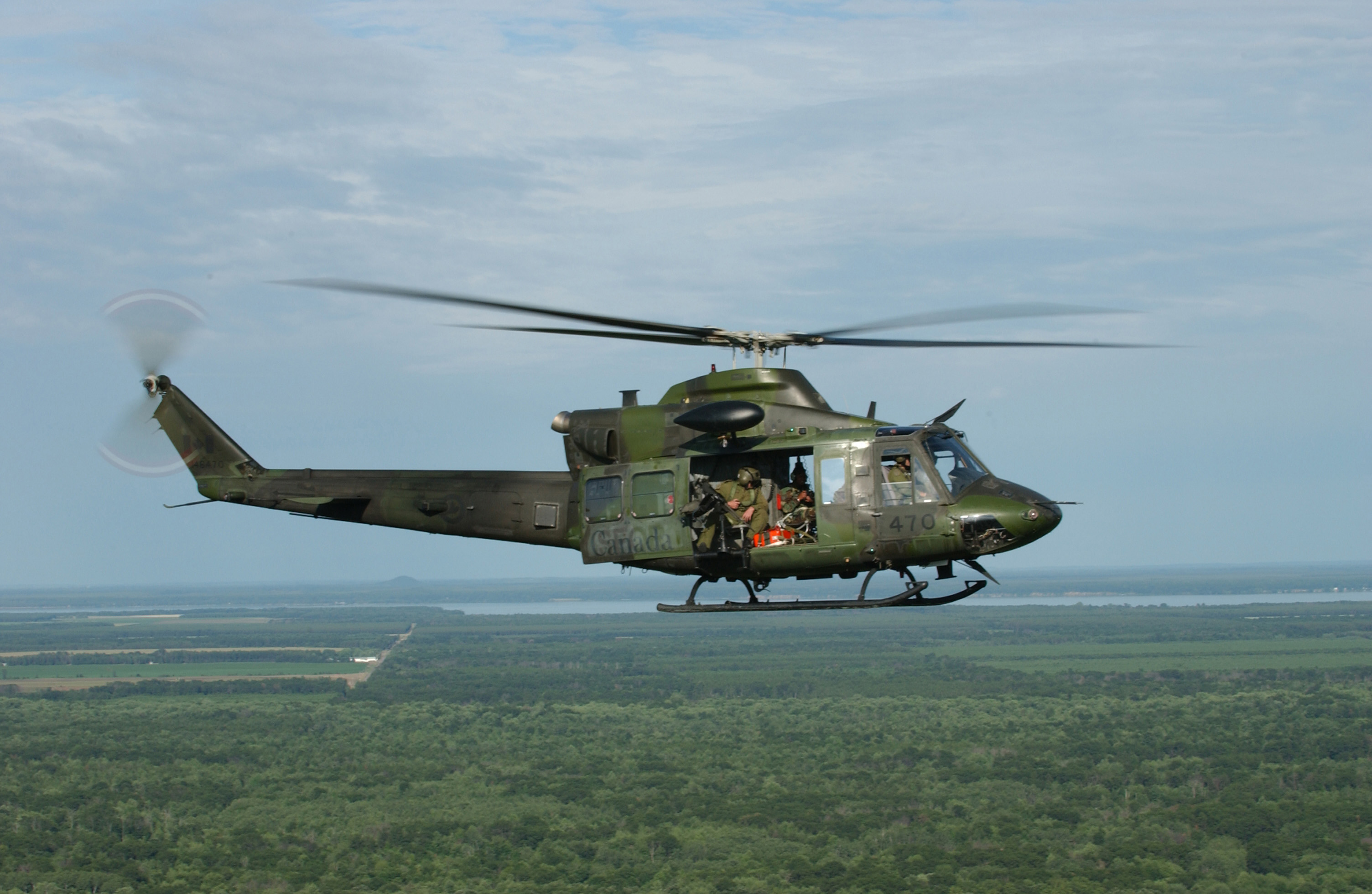
CH-146 Griffon on exercises in 2006

The Bell CH-146 Griffon is a multi-role utility helicopter designed by Bell Helicopter Textron as a variant of the Bell 412EP for the Canadian Armed Forces. It is used in a wide variety of roles, including aerial firepower, reconnaissance, search and rescue and aero-mobility tasks. The CH-146 has a crew of three, can carry up to ten troops and has a cruising speed of 220 km/h (120 kn; 140 mph).

The CH-146 is a continuation of decades long use of the Huey family by Canadian military, starting with the UH-1H model in 1968, and expanded by use of the UH-1N Twin Huey; known as the CH-118 and CH-135 respectively. Both were retired in the 1990s and replaced by the CH-146; it also replaced early model CH-147 Chinook and CH-136 Kiowa helicopters, although in the 2010s additional Chinooks were acquired of the latest type. The CH-146 has served in missions internationally and domestically. They were built in Canada. The fleet is currently being modernized for service into the 2030s.

== Design and development ==
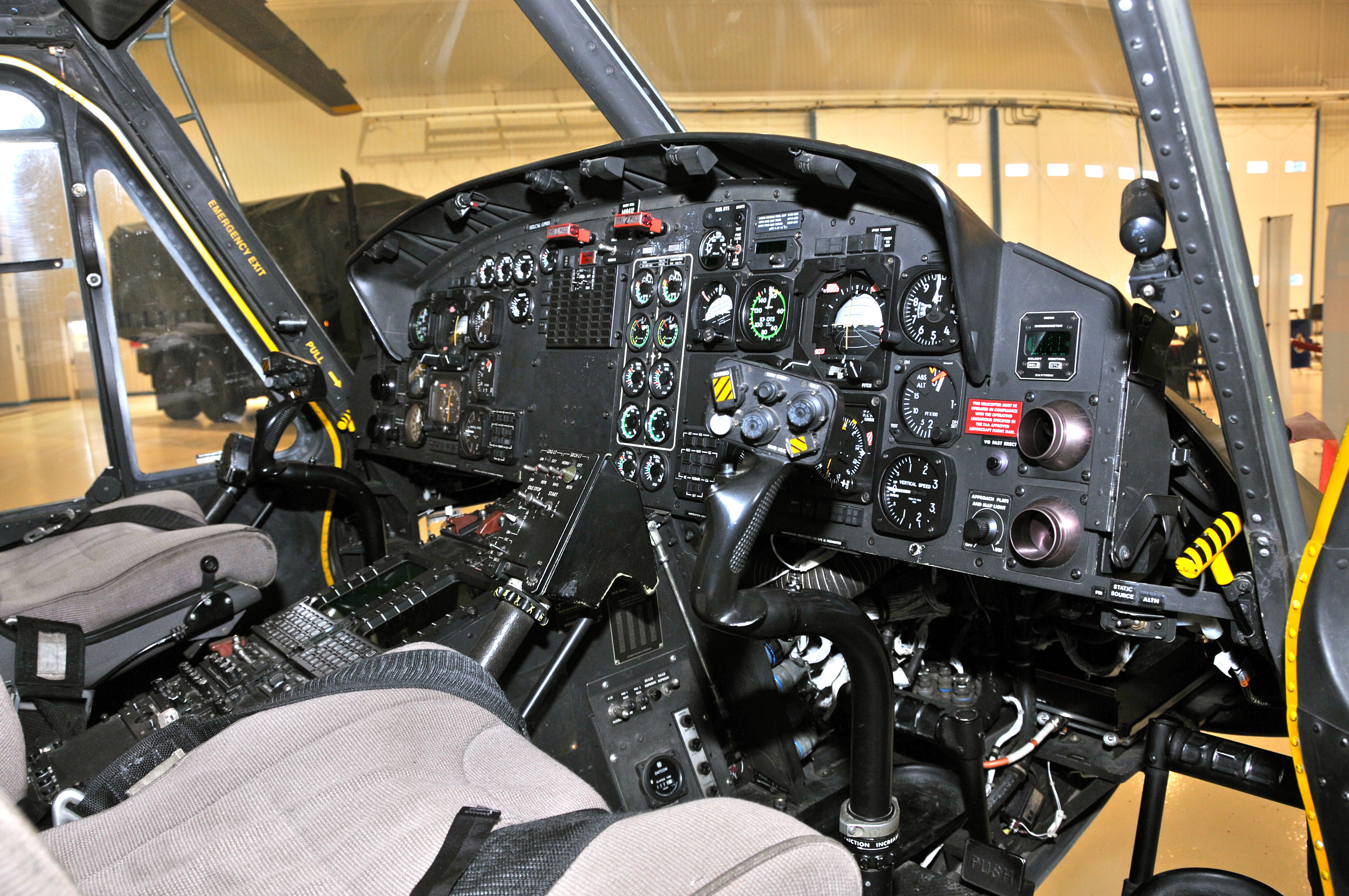
CH-146 cockpit

The CH-146 is the Canadian military designation for the Bell 412CF, a modified Bell 412, ordered by Canada in 1992. The CH-146 was built at Mirabel, Quebec, at the Bell Canadian plant. It was delivered between 1995 and 1997 in one of two configurations, the Combat Support Squadron (CSS) version for search and rescue missions, and the Utility Tactical Transport Helicopter (UTTH), which carries a crew of three and an eight-man section.

The Bell 412 family is popular with military operators globally, and was also produced under license in Italy by Augusta;the 412 and its variants was further modernization of the Bell 212.

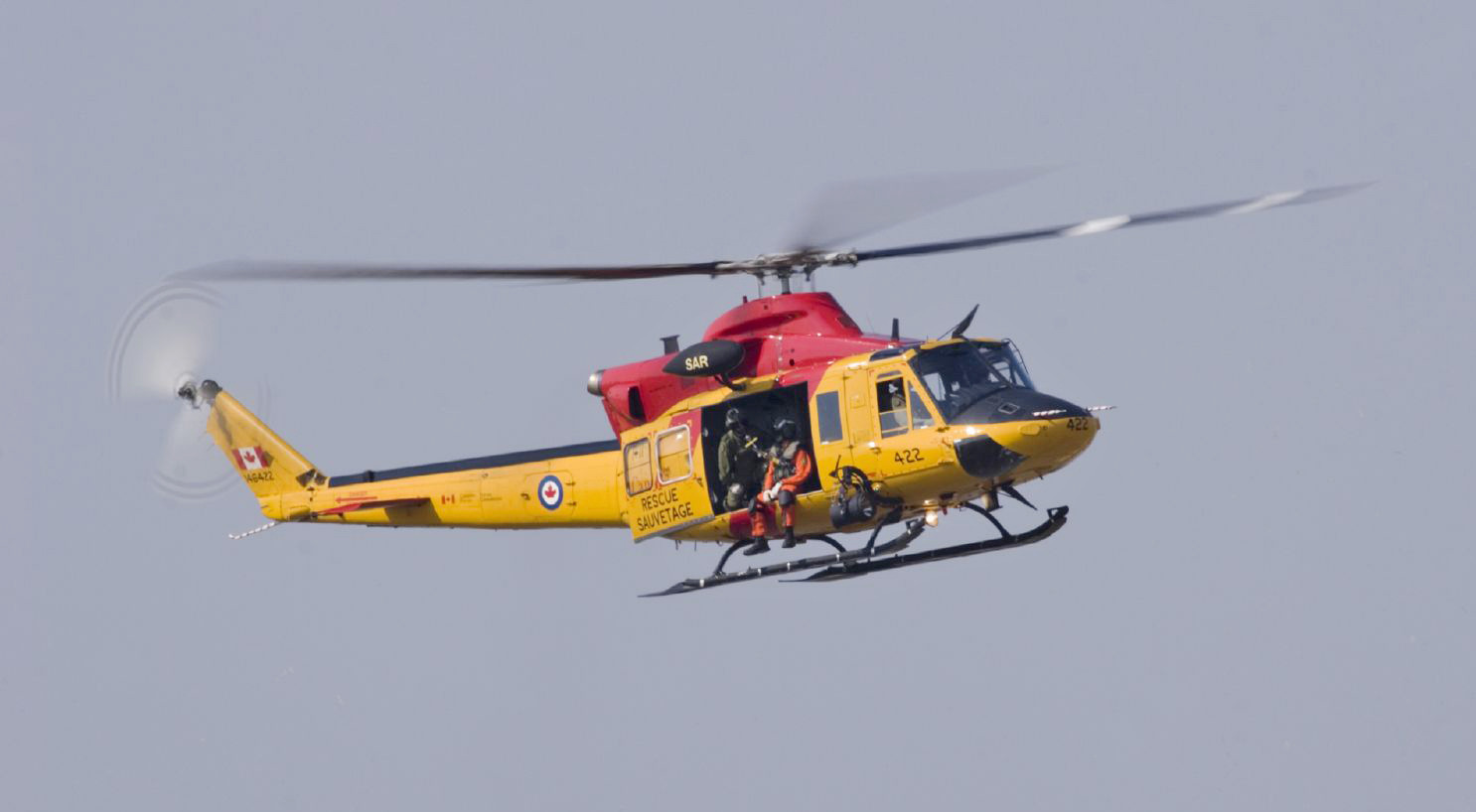
RCAF CH-146 Griffon in SAR markings

The Griffon can be equipped with various specialized bolt-on mission kits which can enhance its performance, from increasing range to improving protection against enemy fire, etc.

While the CH-146 can be equipped with a total of 13 seats in the cargo area in addition to the two in front for the aircrew, weight restrictions usually result in a normal combat load of eight equipped troops or fewer depending on armament and fuel carried. The aircraft can also be configured for up to six stretchers.

Minor disassembly permits transport of the Griffon by CC-130 Hercules or CC-177 Globemaster III aircraft for long-distance deployment.

=== Maintenance and upgrades ===
The CH-146 was forecast to be retired as early as 2021, but with an option to extend. Bell Helicopter Textron Canada Inc. was awarded a C$640 million contract to overhaul and repair the CH-146 fleet until retirement in 2021. The contract includes options to extend the contract up to 2025 if necessary.

In January 2019, Canada announced plans to modernize and extend the life of the existing 85 CH-146s to 2031. In May 2022, the contract was signed. The contract with Bell Canada will allow the type to be in service until the 2030s. The maintenance work is done in Canada and sustains over 1100 jobs there.

In April 2024, the Government of Canada announced plans to spend C$18.4 billion over 20 years to acquire additional helicopters that are more "modern, mobile, and effective" to increase the speed and airlift capacity in responding to natural disasters, emergencies, and assertions of sovereignty. It is not clear if implication is to supplement or replace the CH-146 fleet. The CH-146 is one of several assets in Canada's vertical lift portfolio which, by the 2020s, includes the CH-149 Cormorant (Medium-lift Search and Rescue (EH101)), CH-147 Chinook (twin-rotor heavy-lift), CH-148 Cyclone (maritime medium lift transport and ASW (S-92)), among others.

In 2024, the Canadian Government announced a service contract to sustain the CH-146 Griffon fleet.

== Operational history ==
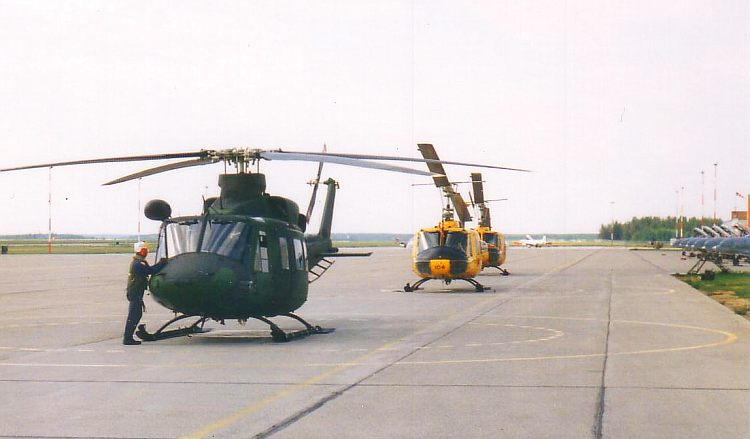
The first CH-146 Griffon arrives at 417 Squadron, CFB Cold Lake. It is parked on the flightline with the CH-118 it is to replace.

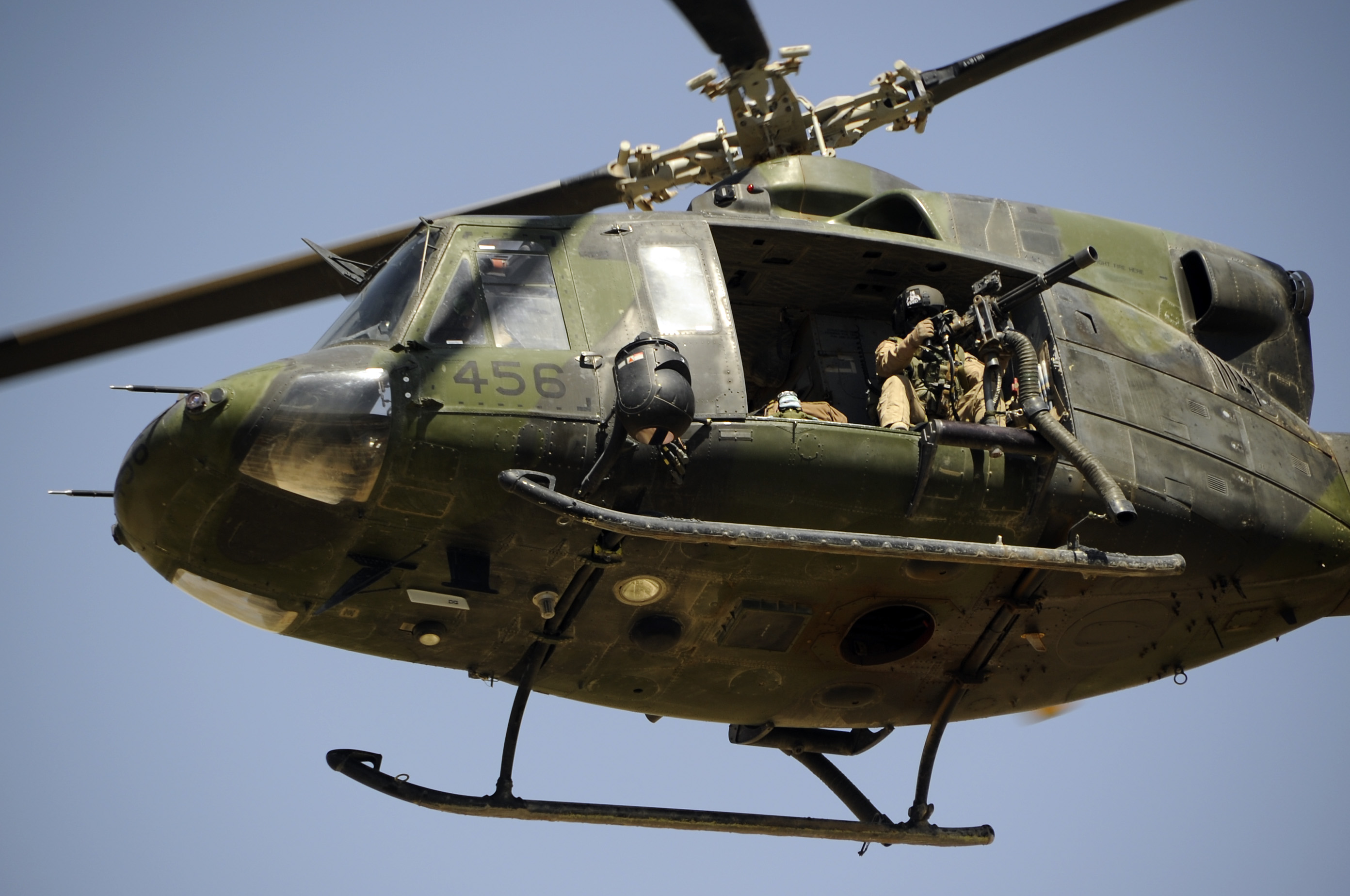
CH-146 Griffon in Afghanistan armed with a Dillon Aero M134D "Minigun"

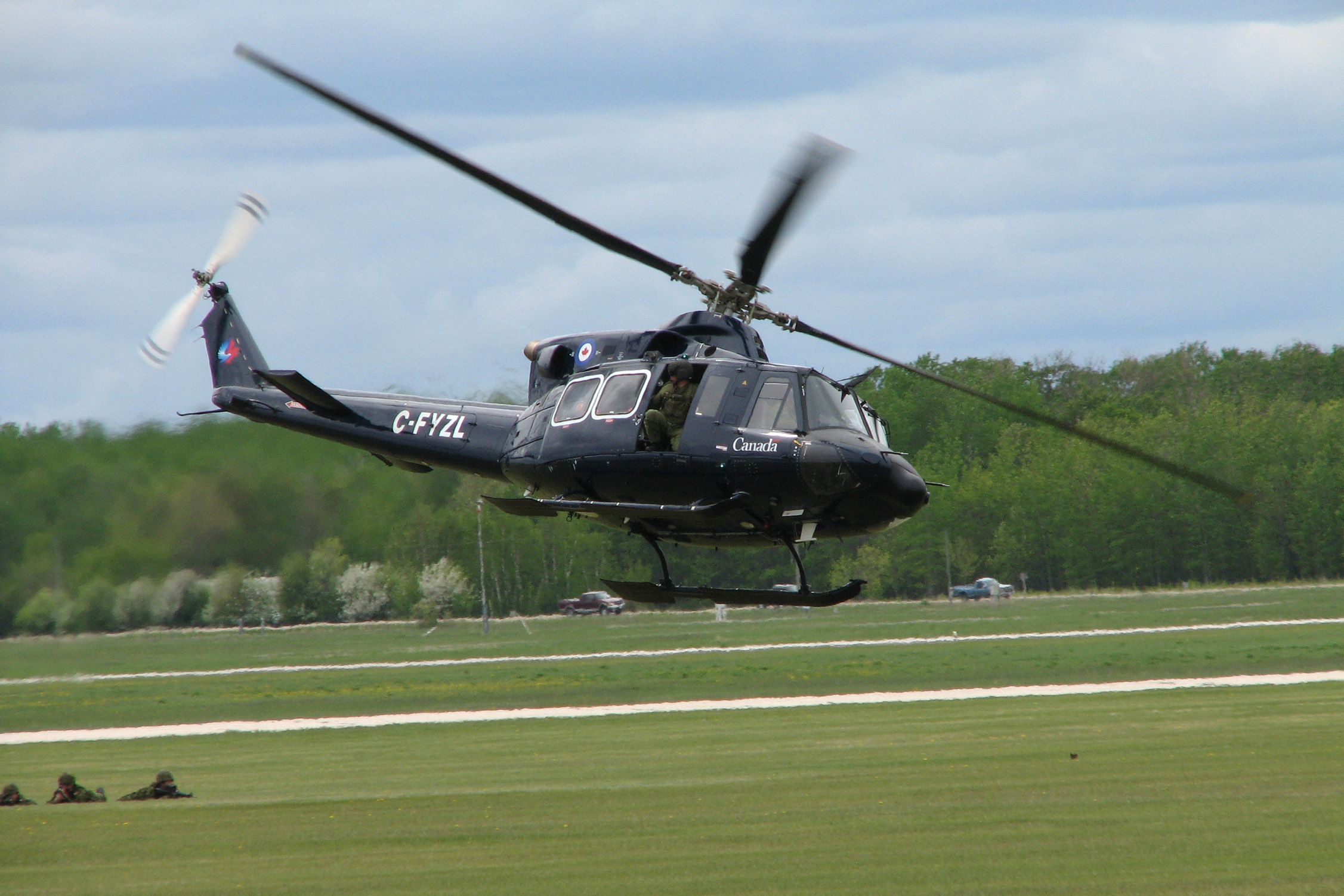
Trainer version at the 2009 Portage-la-Prairie air show

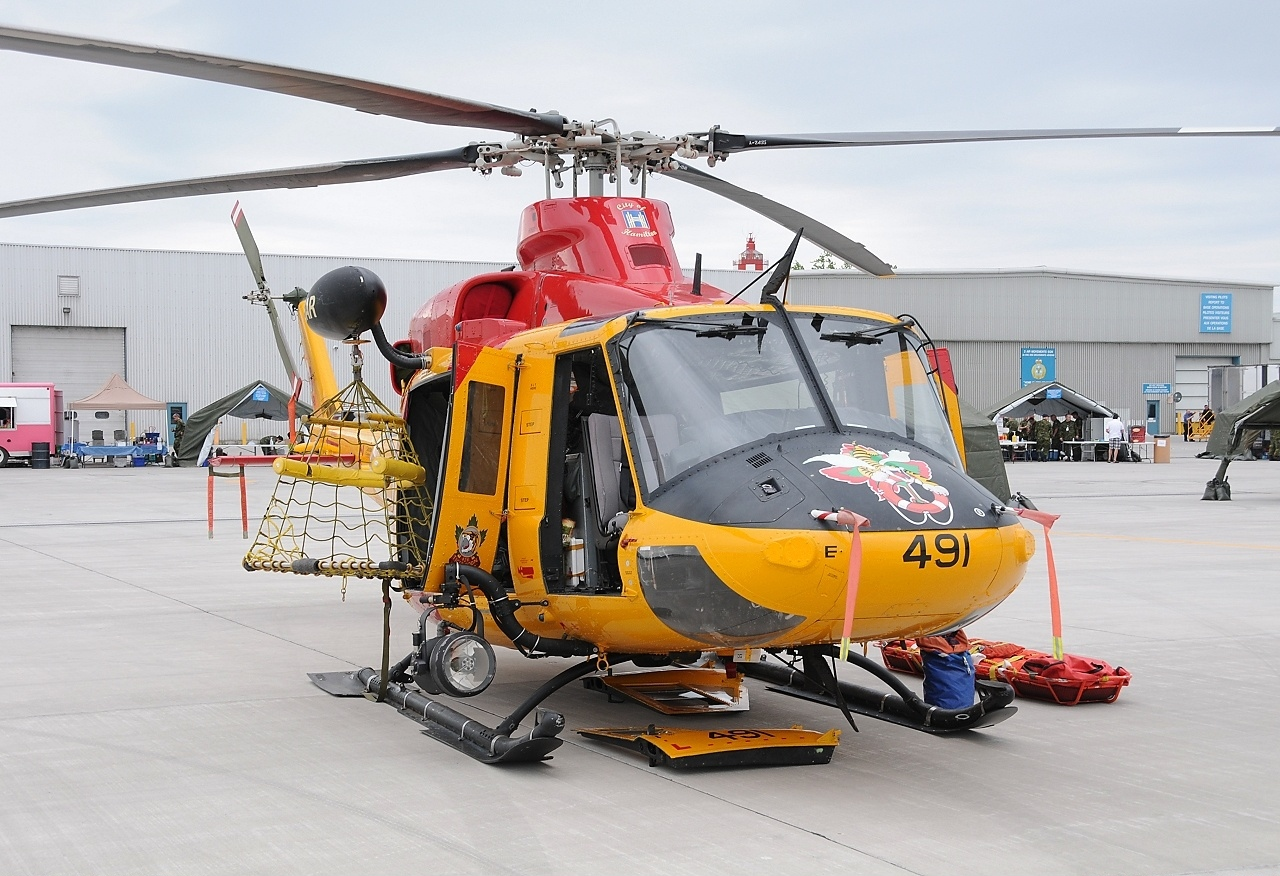
Search & Rescue CH-146 during open house showing rescue equipment

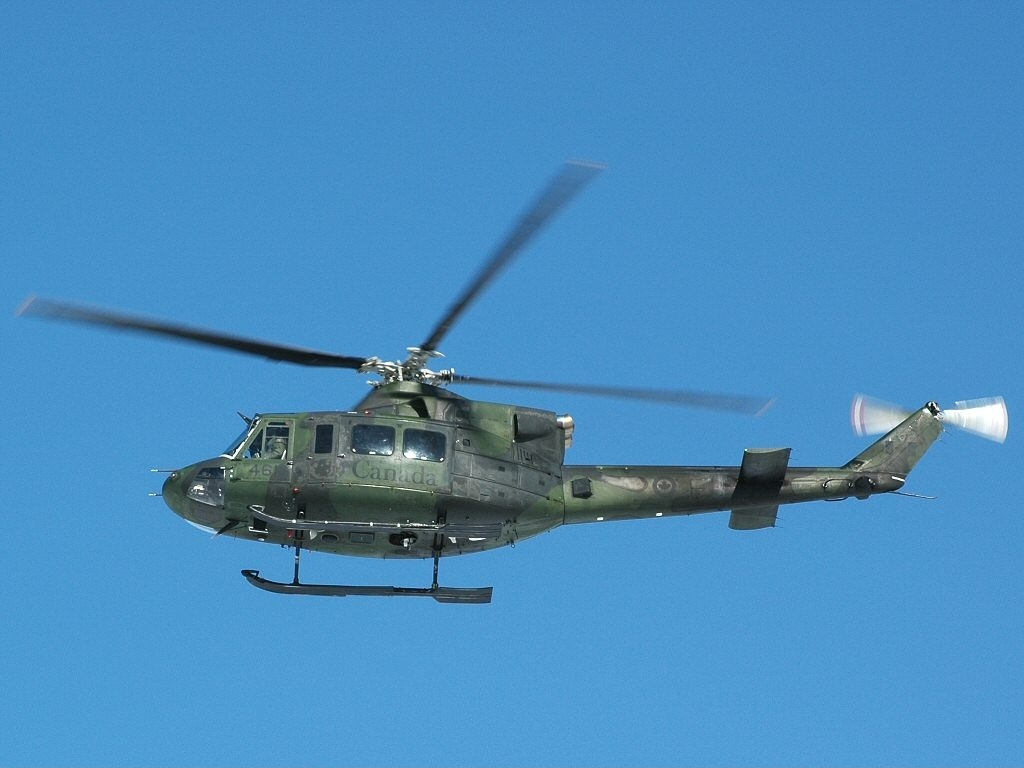
Army CH-146 in flight

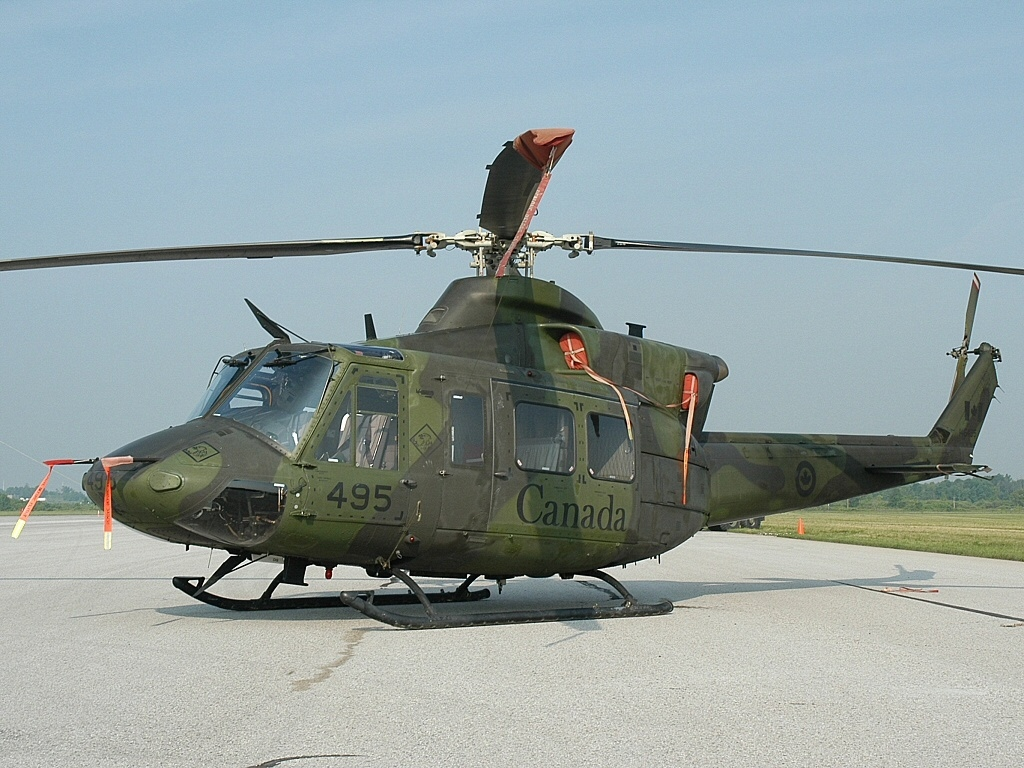
On display in London, Ontario for the Veterans' Flying Salute in 2005

The Canadian Forces purchased 100 aircraft and received them in 1995–1997. In 2005, nine CH-146s were sold to the Allied Wings consortium to be used as trainers at 3 Canadian Forces Flying Training School. By the 2020s, over 80 were still in service in 11 squadrons, and Canada planned to operate them into the 2030s.

Some of the task the helicopters are used for are training, utility, tactical transport, search and rescue, armed escort for Chinooks.

=== Canada ===
The CH-146 Griffon have been deployed in various operations in Canada since their introduction in 1995. They have been deployed during the Operation Saguenay in 1996 and Operation Assistance in 1997. The CH-146 have also played a major role during the great ice storm of 1998. They were deployed during the 28th G8 summit and 36th G8 summit. They were also deployed to secure the 2010 Winter Olympics during the Operation Podium. In May 2016, four Griffons were deployed as part of Operation LENTUS 16-01, to provide emergency services for victims of the 2016 Fort McMurray wildfire.

=== Haiti and Balkans ===
CH-146s have been deployed in Haiti. They were deployed during Operation Standard and Operation Constable between 1996 and 1997. They were deployed more recently during Operation Halo in 2004 and Operation Hestia in 2010.

Griffons have been deployed in Bosnia and Kosovo during Operation Kinetic between 1999 and 2000 and Operation Paladium between 1998 and 2004.

=== Afghanistan ===
In 2007, the Canadian American Strategic Review suggested that the Canadian Forces consider deploying Griffons to Afghanistan, because they were comparable to the UH-1 Hueys deployed by the United States Marine Corps. The USMC used both the Bell UH-1N Twin Huey (also used by Canada) and the newer Bell UH-1Y Venom.

On 26 November 2008, the Canadian Forces announced in a statement that eight Griffons would be modified to act as armed escorts for CH-147 Chinook helicopters in Afghanistan. Equipped with a M134D Minigun, the helicopters were employed in a defensive and support role, including the evacuation of battlefield casualties. The eight CH-146s arrived at Kandahar International Airport on 20 December 2008.

=== Suitability for role ===
The CH-146 was purchased by the CF to replace four existing helicopters, the CH-136 Kiowa in the observation role, the CH-135 Twin Huey in the army tactical role, the CH-118 Iroquois in the base rescue role and the heavy lift CH-147 Chinook. From the time of its purchase defence analysts have been critical of the aircraft pointing to its procurement as politically motivated and that the aircraft cannot adequately fill any of its intended roles. It has been termed "a civilian designed and built aircraft, with only a coat of green paint."

Writing in 2006 defence analyst Sharon Hobson said:

The Griffon helicopter has become almost a laughing stock. It is underpowered for the transport role the army needs it to play, and it’s too big for a reconnaissance role. At a time when the Canadian Forces are thirsting for equipment, it’s telling that about 20 of the Griffons have been parked.

The CH-146 was ruled out for the Afghan mission by General Rick Hillier when he was Chief of Defence Staff in 2008 due to being underpowered. It has also been criticised for being underpowered by Martin Shadwick, a defence analyst and professor at York University. Shadwick stated in July 2009:

Its engines are fine for most domestic requirements in Canada and a more moderate temperature, but [the Griffon] doesn't really have the horsepower to reach its full potential in a place like Afghanistan.

At the inquest into the death of Capt Ben Babington-Browne (killed on 6 July 2009 in the crash of aircraft #146434), Lt Cdr William Robley of the UK Defence Helicopter Flying School confirmed that operating the aircraft at that altitude, temperature and weight meant that it was not the correct helicopter for that mission. When asked by the coroner: "Had you been there, would it have been obvious to you of the risks attached to using the Griffon helicopter in these conditions?" Lt Cdr Robley replied: "Yes." When asked: "Would you expect a competent pilot to have understood that this was not the correct helicopter for the mission?", Lt Cdr Robley replied: "It depended on the pilot's training; unless they have been trained, they are on a voyage of discovery."

Retired Lieutenant General Lou Cuppens defended the aircraft's performance:

When the discussions took place about Afghanistan it was very quickly determined that when you do the weather analysis, that the aircraft could not carry the same combat load of troops that it could in Canada and land in a temperate climate. But all you do then is, you use more of them to do the same mission. Looking at operations that we've done elsewhere in the Middle East, with similar aircraft, they all have limitations of some sort and you work with the limitations."

Defence Minister Peter MacKay also defended the aircraft:

I believe the Griffon is a superior helicopter, well-maintained, it's a utility helicopter that serves our interests both in Afghanistan and for purposes here in Canada.

=== Latvia ===
Starting in 2025, Canada is planning to send 4 Griffon's to Latvia, as part of a NATO mission there, specifically Operation REASSURANCE.

== Operators ==
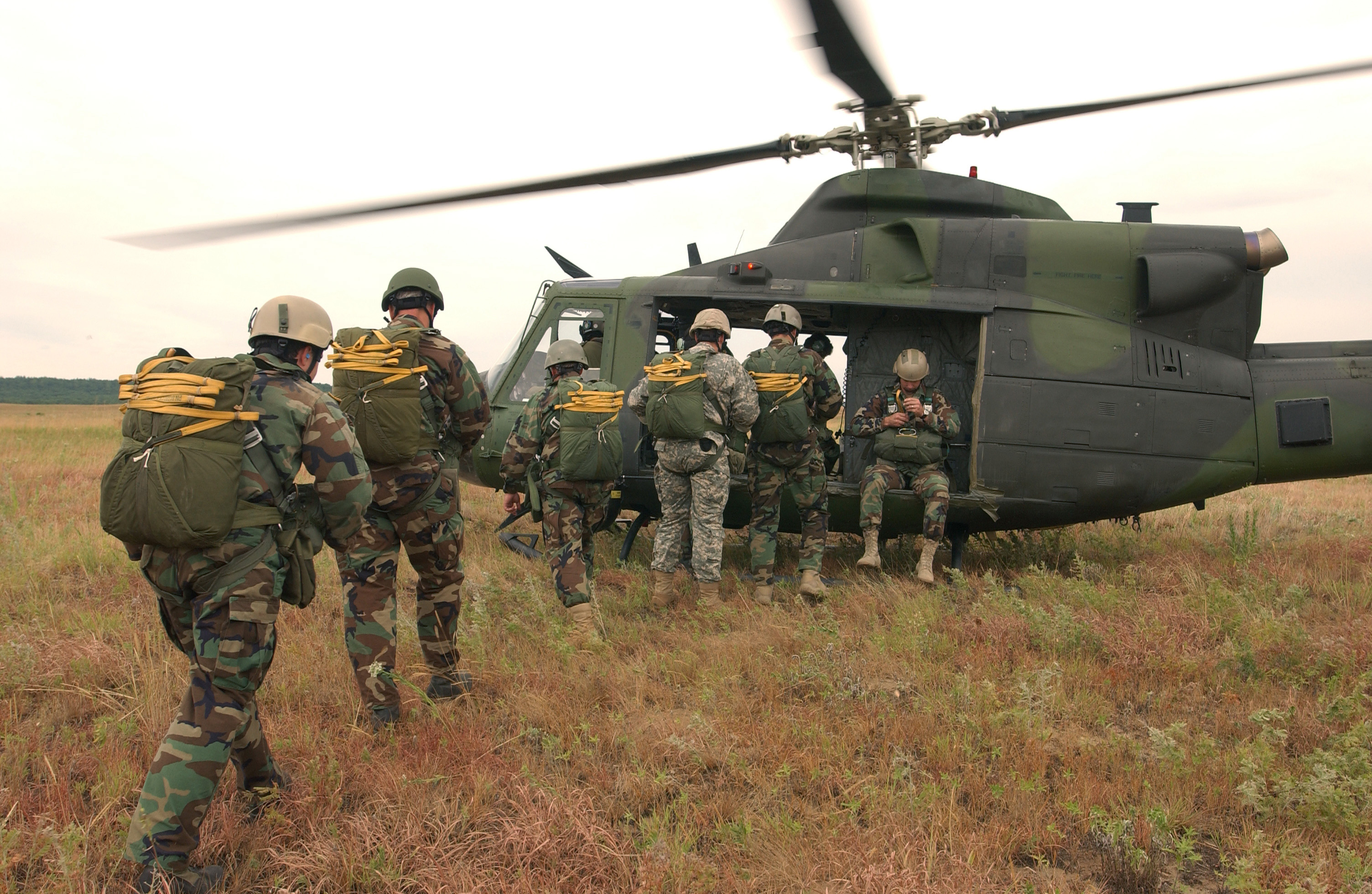
U.S. Army National Guard paratroopers from 2nd Battalion, 20th Special Forces Group and 116th Air Support Operations Squadron board a CH-146 Griffon.

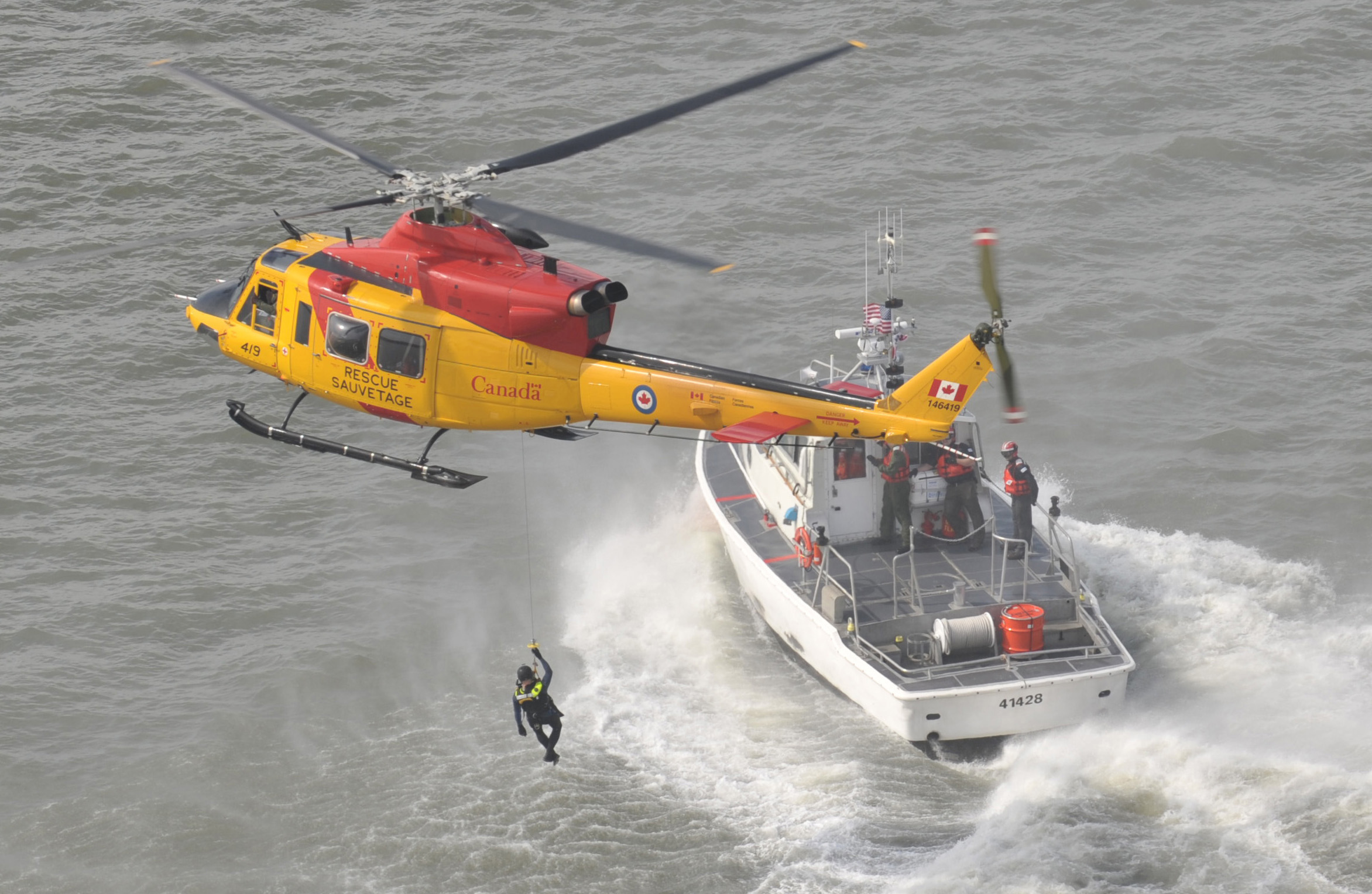
A CH-146 of the Royal Canadian Air Force 424 Squadron conducts rescue swimmer hoist training in 2012

See Bell 412 military operators for other users, the CH-146 is the Canadian version of this aircraft.

Canada

- Royal Canadian Air Force - 75 as of January 2025

Tactical Helicopter role

- 400 Tactical Helicopter Squadron
- 403 Helicopter Operational Training Squadron
- 408 Tactical Helicopter Squadron
- 427 Special Operations Aviation Squadron
- 430 Tactical Helicopter Squadron
- 438 Tactical Helicopter Squadron

Search and Rescue role

- 424 Transport and Rescue Squadron

Combat Support Squadrons

- 417 Combat Support Squadron
- 439 Combat Support Squadron
- 444 Combat Support Squadron

== Accidents and incidents ==
- On 18 July 2002, #146420 operated by 444 Sqn crashed north of CFB Goose Bay while returning from a search and rescue mission that had been called off. Both pilots were killed on impact and the SAR Technician and Flight Engineer were both seriously injured. The cause of the crash was the loss of the aircraft tail rotor after a tail rotor blade failed from fatigue.
- On 6 July 2009, #146434 crashed about 80 kilometres (50 miles) northeast of Kandahar city in Afghanistan, killing two Canadian soldiers, along with a captain from the British Royal Engineers. Three other Canadians were hurt. The crash was reportedly an accident due to the pilot's loss of visual reference in recirculating dust and not due to enemy action, but an inquest into the death of Capt Ben Babington-Browne was told that the helicopter was unsuitable for hot and high operations in Afghanistan. In April 2016, it was revealed that a military police investigation of senior air force officers was underway for negligence for not providing adequate training for aircrew in dealing with takeoffs in dusty conditions and also for raising the operational gross weight of the aircraft above that safe for operation.

== Specifications (CH-146) ==

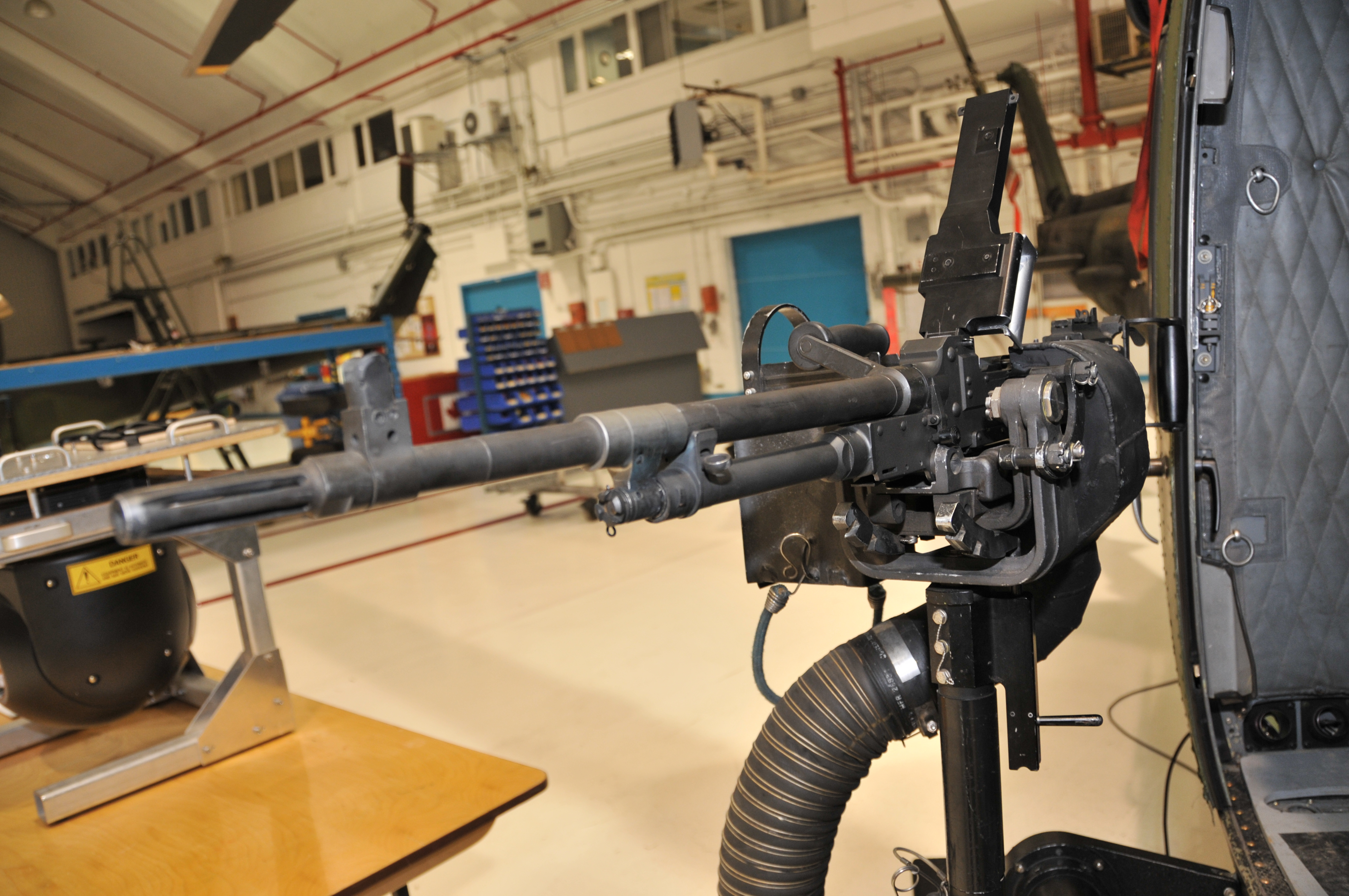
Closeup of starboard side C6 GPMG

Data from Department of National Defence

General characteristics

- Crew: 3 (pilot, co-pilot, and flight engineer)
- Capacity: 10 troops or 6 stretchers (some sources state maximum 8 passengers)
- Length: 56 ft 1 in (17.09 m)
- Height: 15 ft 1 in (4.60 m)
- Max takeoff weight: 11,900 lb (5,398 kg)
- Powerplant: 1 × Pratt & Whitney Canada PT6T-3D Twin-Pac coupled turboshaft engine, 1,250 shp (930 kW)

900 shp (671 kW) single power section emergency power

- Main rotor diameter: 46 ft 0 in (14.02 m)
- Main rotor area: 1,662 sq ft (154.4 m^{2})
- Blade sections: - root Boeing VR-7; tip Wortmann FX 71-H-080

Performance

- Maximum speed: 140 kn (160 mph, 260 km/h)
- Cruise speed: 118 kn (136 mph, 219 km/h)
- Range: 354 nmi (407 mi, 656 km)

Armament

- 7.62 mm C6 general purpose machine gun (GPMG) optionally mounted in one or both doors
- 7.62 mm Dillon Aero M134D "Minigun" optionally mounted in one or both doors
- .50 Cal (12.7 mm) GAU-21, as part of Interoperable Griffon Reconnaissance Escort Surveillance System (INGRESS) project.
- Removable armour to protect crew and cabin area occupants from small arms fire and fragmentation.

Avionics

- WESCAM 16TD-A Thermal Imaging System (TIS) stabilized camera system
- Crew equipped with Generation III Image Intensification (II) Night Vision
- CMC Electronics CMA-2082A Flight Management System

== See also ==
Related development

- Bell Huey family
- Bell UH-1N Twin Huey
- Bell 212
- Bell 412

Related lists

- List of aircraft of the Royal Canadian Air Force
- List of Canadian Air Force Equipment
