= Tactical engagement simulation =

Weapons use training system

A Tactical Engagement Simulation (TES) is a training system for using weapons. Laser transmitters are typically used instead of bullets, larger rounds, or shorter-range guided weapons such as anti-tank missiles. A laser transmitter is mounted on the weapon and aligned with the weapon's barrel. However, some engagement simulators are capable of also utilizing live firing in order to increase the fidelity of the training simulation.

Gallium arsenide (GaAs) is often used as the stimulated medium and this produces a wavelength of 904 nanometres, in the near infrared band outside the sensitivity of the human eye which is from about 400 to 700 nm (0.4 to 0.7 micrometres).

In modern TES systems the laser transmission is coded so that in a field exercise, individual weapons can be identified by exercise control (EXCON) and appropriate calculations made of gravity drop, warhead damage radius and so forth.

Weapons as small as hand guns can be part of a TES system as can larger weapons including tanks and large calibre guns. In field exercises, the laser transmitters can trigger cartridge-based Weapon effects simulation (WES) devices mounted on potential targets such as tanks and other vehicles. WES systems include pyrotechnic flash/bang and smoke devices that add realism to a field exercise.

All these events are recorded on the exercise computer. After-Action Review (AAR) can include comprehensive analysis of weapon firing, accuracy and warhead effects on the targets. Such techniques have taken much speculation out of the assessment of field exercises and have resulted in more realistic training than used to be available other than by using (dangerous) live firing.
