= Air combat maneuvering instrumentation =

Data recorder in the military

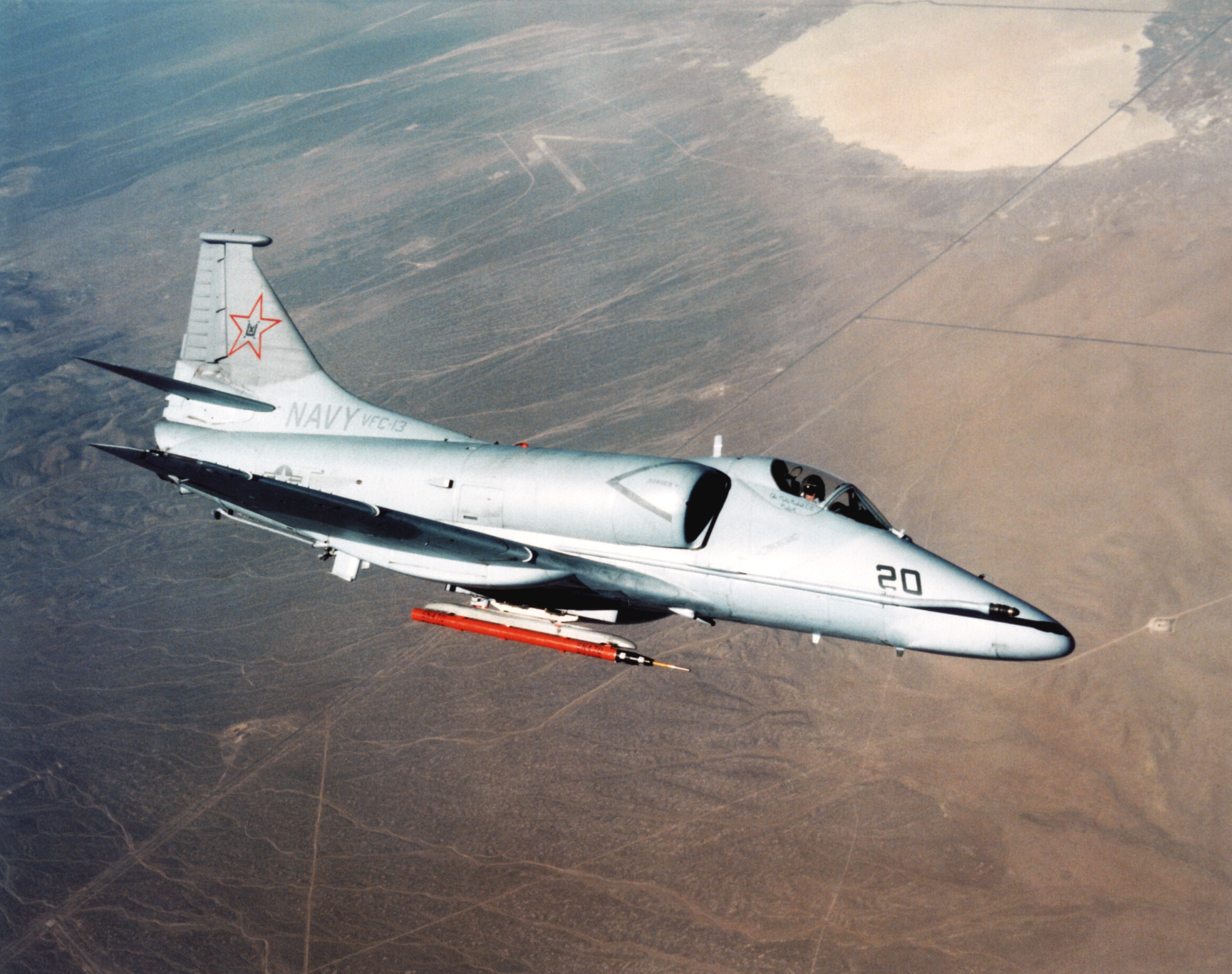
Skyhawk with an ACMI pod

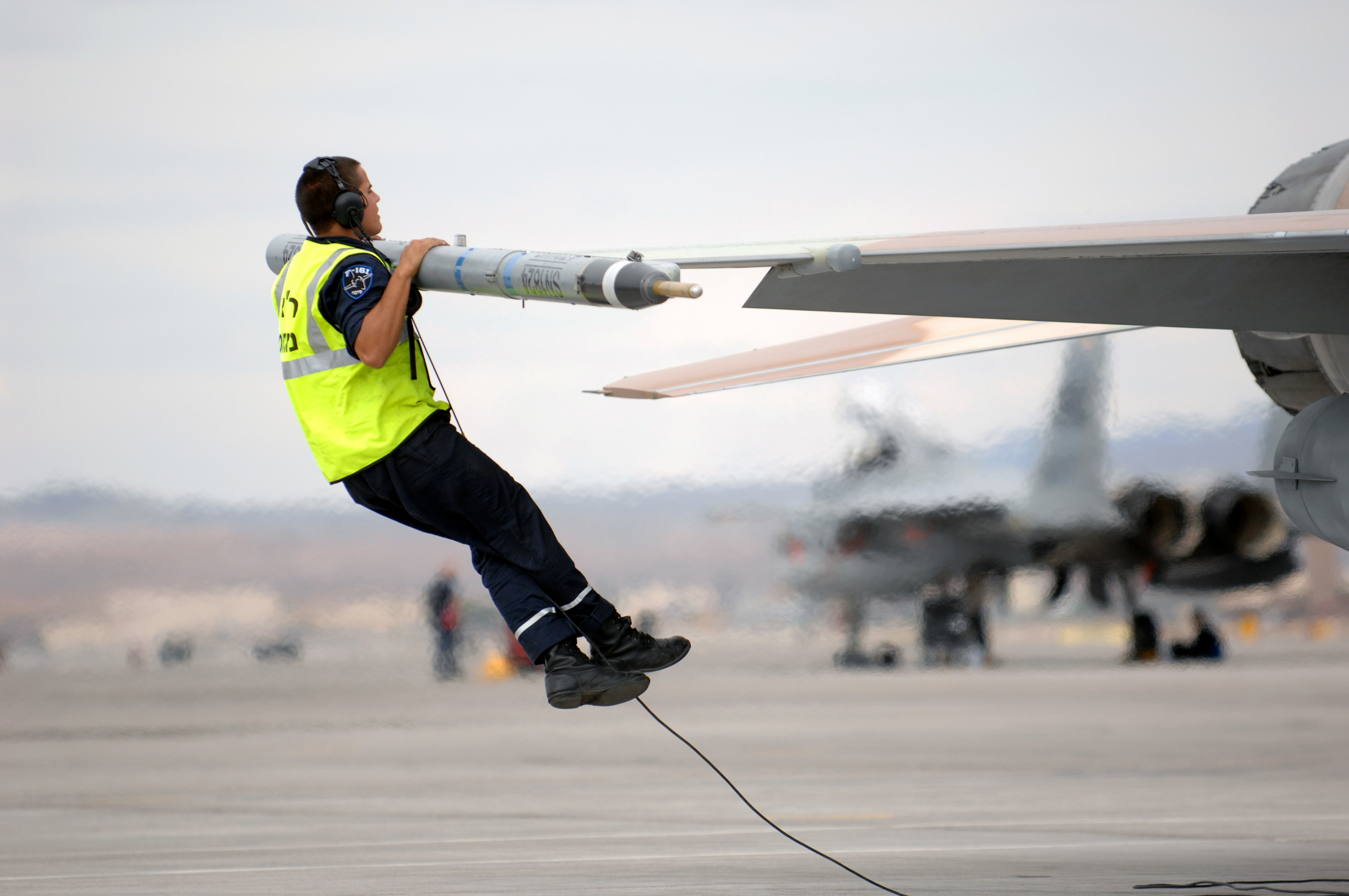
ACMI pod on an F-16

Air Combat Maneuvering Instrumentation (ACMI) systems record an aircraft's in-flight data. They are often used by the military for aerial combat training and analysis.

== Subsystems ==
ACMI usually includes 4 major subsystems.

Control and Computation
The Control and Computation Subsystem (CCS) is usually a rack-mounted personal computer running applications that calculate Time-Space-Position-Information (TSPI).

Transmission Instrumentation
The Transmission Instrumentation Subsystem (TIS) is firmware running at or near a communications tower on the range the aircraft are flying around. The TIS will have 1–9 interrogators (remotes) scattered throughout the range. One of these remotes is at the TIS, and is referred to as the "remote at Master". Each remote interrogates an AIS pod (see below) loaded on each aircraft flying on range, and receives the response and relays it to the TIS.

Airborne Instrumentation
Antiquated ACMI systems triangulated each pod's position and relayed that TSPI back to the CCS. Modern ACMI systems no longer triangulate; instead, a GPS unit is installed in each Airborne Instrumentation Subsystem (AIS) pod to calculate its own position, thereby relieving the CCS of the triangulation algorithm. The CCS now gets a complete TSPI message from the AIS pod via the TIS, and forwards this data to a display system.

Advanced Display and Debriefing or Individual Combat Aircrew Display
Advanced Display and Debriefing Subsystems (ADDS) are quickly vanishing and being replaced by Individual Combat Aircrew Display Systems (ICADS) because the ICADS software can run on any compatible personal computer. ICADS is the display software that receives data from the CCS and displays it in a three-dimensional graphical user interface.

== Autonomous air combat maneuvering instrumentation ==
Autonomous air combat maneuvering instrumentation (AACMI) are second-generation GPS-based ACMI systems.

Unlike first-generation ACMI systems, which use ground radars to track and record the position of the aircraft on the range, AACMI systems use aircraft-mounted satellite navigation systems such as the US NAVSTAR GPS system. Recording of aircraft tracks can therefore be independent of ground-based radar, and are sometimes called range-less or autonomous. Radio transmissions from the aircraft report its position in three dimensions to other aircraft on the range and also to ground control. This enables real-time air-to-air exercises to be carried out and also complex ground debriefs (after-action review or AAR) based on data recorded at the time. Such de-briefs involve the use of modern graphics and display techniques that can bring out training and other points to aircrew and ground staff. Newer AACMI systems are hand-held units that can be mounted to the dash of any aircraft, vehicle, vessel, or person, and can perform all the functions of legacy ACMI systems.

== See also ==
- Arotech Corporation
- Cubic Corporation
