= List of museums in Ontario =

This list of museums in Ontario, Canada contains museums which are defined for this context as institutions (including nonprofit organizations, government entities, and private businesses) that collect and care for objects of cultural, artistic, scientific, or historical interest and make their collections or related exhibits available for public viewing. Also included are non-profit art galleries and university art galleries. Museums that exist only in cyberspace (i.e., virtual museums) are not included.

See also List of museums in Ottawa for museums in the city of Ottawa.
See also List of museums in Toronto for museums in the city of Toronto.

== Current museums ==
| Name | Location | Census division | Region | Type | Summary | Website |
|---|---|---|---|---|---|---|
| 1000 Islands History Museum (Arthur Child Heritage Museum) | Gananoque | Leeds and Grenville | Eastern | Multiple | Area cultural and natural history, including 1000 Islands ecosystem, First Nations and early settlers, military and tourism exhibits, impact of the St. Lawrence River | |
| Adelaide Hunter Hoodless Homestead | St. George | County of Brant | Golden Horseshoe | Historic house | Mid-19th-century childhood farm home of Adelaide Hunter Hoodless, founder of the Women's Institute | |
| Agnes Etherington Art Centre | Kingston | Frontenac County | Eastern | Art | Operated by Queen's University, includes Canadian, European, Inuit and African art, decorative arts | |
| Algonquin Provincial Park | Whitney | Nipissing District | Northeastern | Multiple | Includes the visitor center with exhibits about the area's natural and cultural history, and a logging museum | |
| Alix Art Gallery | Sarnia | Lambton County | Southwestern | Art | Includes paintings by the Group of Seven, contemporary and historically significant Canadian visual art and visual culture | |
| Allan Macpherson House | Napanee | Lennox and Addington County | Eastern | Historic house | c.1830 period house, Georgian architecture built by Napanee's first postmaster and a prominent local figure, operated by the Lennox and Addington County Museum and Archives | |
| Ameliasburgh Historical Museum | Ameliasburgh | Prince Edward County | Central | Open air | Complex of buildings and exhibits around a church built c.1868 | |
| Amherstburg Freedom Museum | Amherstburg | Essex County | Southwestern | African American | Focus on the Underground Railroad, black history in Canada, includes 19th-century church and log cabin | |
| Anderson Farm Museum | Lively | Greater Sudbury | Northeastern | Agriculture | Operated by Greater Sudbury Heritage Museums, historic 1920s period farmhouse, barn and milk house | |
| Annandale National Historic Site | Tillsonburg | Oxford | Southwestern | Historic house | 1880s Victorian house known for its lavish Aesthetic art decorations | |
| Arbor Gallery | Vankleek Hill | Prescott and Russell | Eastern | Art | Contemporary art centre | |
| Arkona Lions Museum | Arkona | Lambton County | Southwestern | Natural history | Features Devonian fossils and First Nations artifacts from the Lambton County area | |
| Arnprior & District Museum | Arnprior | Renfrew County | Eastern | Local history | Also hosts visiting exhibits on a variety of subjects | |
| Art Gallery of Algoma | Sault Ste. Marie | Algoma District | Northeastern | Art | Visual art | |
| Art Gallery of Burlington | Burlington | Halton Region | Golden Horseshoe | Art | Contemporary art centre, focus on visual art and crafts | |
| Art Gallery of Guelph | Guelph | Wellington County | Southwestern | Art | Exhibits of contemporary and historical art, craft and design | |
| Art Gallery of Hamilton | Hamilton | Hamilton | Golden Horseshoe | Art | Includes Canadian and European works | |
| Art Gallery of Mississauga | Mississauga | Peel Region | Golden Horseshoe | Art | Emphasis on area artists and Canadian art | |
| Art Gallery of Northumberland | Cobourg | Northumberland | Central | Art | | |
| Art Gallery of Peterborough | Peterborough | Peterborough County | Central | Art | Focus is Canadian art | |
| Art Gallery of Sudbury | Sudbury | Greater Sudbury | Northeastern | Art | Contemporary art | |
| Art Windsor-Essex | Windsor | Essex County | Southwestern | Art | Significant works of art by local, regional and national artists | |
| Artcite | Windsor | Essex County | Southwestern | Art | Artist-run contemporary and experimental art centre | |
| Artery Gallery | Kitchener | Waterloo Region | Golden Horseshoe | Art | Curated and managed by the student Society of Fine Artists of the University of Waterloo | |
| Artspace Peterborough | Peterborough | Peterborough County | Central | Art | Artist-run contemporary art centre | |
| Assiginack Museum Complex | Assiginack | Manitoulin District | Northeastern | Open air | Includes the original late 19th-century town lock-up and jailer's home, pioneer home, school, blacksmith shop and driving shed, and the SS Norisle, a steam-powered automobile ferry museum ship | , |
| Atikokan Centennial Museum | Atikokan | Rainy River District | Northwestern | Local history | Includes collection of logging, mining and railroad heavy equipment | |
| Aurora Museum & Archives | Aurora | York Region | Golden Horseshoe | Local history | History and stories of the Town of Aurora | |
| Aylmer & District Museum | Aylmer | Elgin County | Southwestern | Local history | Preserves local artifacts and histories | |
| Backus Mill Heritage and Conservation Centre | Port Rowan | Norfolk County | Southwestern | Open air | Includes 19th-century period buildings, a working historic grist mill and a nature centre | |
| Backus-Page House Museum | Wallacetown | Elgin County | Southwestern | Historic house | Operated by the Tyrconnell Heritage Society, mid-19th-century period house | |
| Bala's Museum | Bala | Muskoka | Central | Biographical | Life of author Lucy Maud Montgomery, author of Anne of Green Gables | |
| Ball's Falls Centre for Conservation | Ball's Falls | Niagara Region | Golden Horseshoe | Natural history | Ecology of the Niagara Escarpment Biosphere Reserve, the natural history of the Twenty Valley and its watershed, and the area's cultural history | |
| Bancroft Gem and Mineral Museum | Bancroft | Hastings County | Central | Mineralology | Area gemstones and minerals, operated by the Bancroft Gem and Mineral Club | |
| Bancroft North Hastings Heritage Museum | Bancroft | Hastings County | Central | Local history | | |
| Banting House National Historic Site | London | Middlesex County | Southwestern | Medical | Life of Sir Frederick Banting, doctor and co-discoverer of insulin | |
| Barn Dance Historical Society Entertainment Museum | Wingham | Huron | Southwestern | Music | Located inside the North Huron Museum, history of the barn dance radio show and its country music performers | |
| Barnum House | Grafton | Northumberland | Central | Historic house | 19th-century period house, operated by Ontario Heritage Trust | |
| Base Borden Military Museum | Borden | Simcoe County | Central | Military | History of CFB Borden, includes planes, tanks, uniforms, weapons | |
| Bath Museum | Bath | Lennox and Addington County | Eastern | Local history | | |
| Battle Ground Hotel Museum | Niagara Falls | Niagara Region | Golden Horseshoe | Historic house | 1850s period hotel on land that was part of the Battle of Lundy's Lane during the War of 1812 | |
| Battle of the Windmill National Historic Site | Prescott | Leeds and Grenville | Eastern | Military | 60 foot stone lighthouse tower, site of the 1838 Battle of the Windmill | |
| Battlefield House | Hamilton | Hamilton | Golden Horseshoe | Historic house | 1835 period house in park that was the site of the War of 1812 Battle of Stoney Creek | |
| Beachville and District Museum | Beachville | Oxford County | Southwestern | Local history | Includes Victorian period room displays, agriculture equipment and vehicles | |
| Beaver River Museum | Beaverton | Durham Region | Central | History | Operated by the Beaverton Thorah Eldon Historical Society, includes mid-19th-century log cabin, 1900 period house and a jail | |
| Bell Homestead National Historic Site | Brantford | County of Brant | Golden Horseshoe | Historic house | 1870s period home of Alexander Graham Bell, exhibits on his life, the invention of the telephone, and the origins of Canadian telephone operations to 1880 | |
| Belleville Scout-Guide Museum | Belleville | Hastings County | Central | Scouting | Open by appointment | |
| Bellevue House National Historic Site | Kingston | Frontenac County | Eastern | Historic house | Late 1840s period home of Canada's first Prime Minister Sir John Alexander Macdonald | |
| Benares Historic House | Mississauga | Peel Region | Golden Horseshoe | Historic house | Early 20th-century period house spanning four family generations | |
| Bethune Memorial House National Historic Site | Gravenhurst | Muskoka | Central | Biographical | Life and achievements of Dr. Henry Norman Bethune | |
| Bethune-Thompson House | Williamstown | Stormont, Dundas and Glengarry | Eastern | Historic house | Late 18th-century house, operated by Ontario Heritage Trust | |
| Billy Bishop Home and Museum | Owen Sound | Grey County | Southwestern | Biographical | Late Victorian birthplace home of WW I flying ace Billy Bishop, also features artifacts from Canadians who fought in the air during World War One and World War Two | |
| Blackwood Gallery | Mississauga | Peel Region | Golden Horseshoe | Art | Contemporary art gallery, part of University of Toronto Mississauga | |
| Blockhouse Museum | Merrickville | Leeds and Grenville | Eastern | Transportation | History of the Rideau Canal, photos, local history exhibits, located in a historic blockhouse, operated by the Merrickville and District Historical Society | |
| Bobby Orr Hall of Fame | Parry Sound | Parry Sound District | Northeastern | Sports | Ice hockey history and memorabilia of Bobby Orr, located in the Charles W. Stockey Centre for the Performing Arts | |
| Bonnechere Museum | Bonnechere | Renfrew County | Eastern | Multiple | Local history, culture and natural history, including area Ordovician fossils, geology, First Nations artifacts, fur trade, timber industry | |
| Bothwell-Zone Oil Museum | Bothwell | Chatham-Kent | Southwestern | Industry | Oil industry powerhouse and equipment, operated by the Bothwell-Zone & District Historical Society | |
| Boyd Heritage Museum | Bobcaygeon | Kawartha Lakes | Central | Local history | | |
| Bradley Museum | Mississauga | Peel Region | Golden Horseshoe | Local history | Complex consists of four buildings, three of which are designated Ontario Heritage sites | |
| Brant Museum & Archives | Brantford | County of Brant | Golden Horseshoe | Art | Operated by the Brant Historical Society, collection of decorative and fine arts | |
| Brantford and Area Sports Hall of Recognition | Brantford | County of Brant | Golden Horseshoe | Sports | Photographs and memorabilia of area sports figures, including Wayne Gretzky | |
| Brocksden Country School Museum | Stratford | Perth County | Southwestern | Education | 19th-century schoolhouse, open by appointment | |
| Brockville Museum | Brockville | Leeds and Grenville | Eastern | Local history | | |
| Brubacher House | Waterloo | Waterloo Region | Golden Horseshoe | Historic house | Operated by the Conrad Grebel University College and the Mennonite Historical Society of Ontario, restored mid-19th-century Pennsylvania German farmstead | |
| Bruce County Museum and Cultural Centre | Southampton | Bruce County | Southwestern | Multiple | Exhibits include local history, natural history, maritime, First Nations, agriculture, maritime, military and culture | |
| Bruce Mines Museum | Bruce Mines | Algoma District | Northeastern | Local history | | |
| Bunker Military Museum | Cobalt | Timiskaming District | Northeastern | Military | Includes artifacts from the Boer War to the present day | , |
| Buxton National Historic Site and Museum | North Buxton | Chatham-Kent | Southwestern | History | Historic buildings in Underground Railroad community | |
| Bygone Days Heritage Village | Collingwood | Simcoe County | Central | Open air | Mid-19th-century village buildings with authentic furnishings and artifacts | |
| Caledonia Grand Trunk Station | Caledonia | Haldimand County | Golden Horseshoe | Railway | Features local railway artifacts, displays and an operating "G" scale model train | |
| Callander Bay Heritage Museum | Callander | Parry Sound District | Northeastern | Multiple | Located in the home of Dr. Allan Roy Dafoe, who delivered and cared for the Dionne quintuplets; includes period doctor's office and dispensary displays, the Dionne quintuplets, a barber shop, period rooms, area logging and maritime history, and the Alex Dufresne Gallery of Art | |
| Cambridge Butterfly Conservatory | Cambridge | Waterloo Region | Golden Horseshoe | Natural history | Butterfly conservatory with live butterflies, birds, plants and natural history exhibits | |
| Cambridge Centre for the Arts | Cambridge | Waterloo Region | Golden Horseshoe | Art | Offers a variety of arts programs, including a gallery | |
| Cambridge Galleries | Cambridge | Waterloo Region | Golden Horseshoe | Art | Part of the Cambridge Public Library system with exhibition space at Queen's Square, Preston and Design at Riverside | |
| Cambridge Sculpture Garden | Cambridge | Waterloo Region | Golden Horseshoe | Art | Outdoor sculpture garden | |
| Campbellford Memorial Military Museum | Campbellford | Northumberland | Central | Military | Collection includes uniforms, weapons and ground transport and features a 60% scale model of the CF-105 Avro Arrow | , |
| Canada Soccer Hall of Fame | Vaughan | York Region | Golden Horseshoe | Sports | Achievements of top Canadian Footballers and Builders who have played and developed the game in Canada | |
| Canada South Science City | Windsor | Essex County | Southwestern | Science | Displays and interactive exhibits | |
| Canada's First Forestry Station | St. Williams | Norfolk County | Southwestern | Forestry | Highlights efforts to plant the area's forests | |
| Canadian Automotive Museum | Oshawa | Durham Region | Central | Automobile | Features mostly Canadian-made cars, automotive history in Canada | |
| Canadian Baseball Hall of Fame | St. Marys | Perth County | Southwestern | Sports | Great players, teams, and accomplishments of baseball in Canada | |
| Canadian Bushplane Heritage Centre | Sault Ste. Marie | Algoma District | Northeastern | Aviation | History of bush flying and forest protection in Canada | |
| Canadian Canoe Museum | Peterborough | Peterborough County | Central | Maritime | Canoe collection and how the canoe defines the Canadian character and spirit | |
| Canadian Clay and Glass Gallery | Waterloo | Waterloo Region | Golden Horseshoe | Art | Historic and contemporary Canadian ceramic, glass and enamel art | |
| Canadian Clock Museum | Deep River | Renfrew County | Eastern | Horology | Heritage of Canada's many clock manufacturers and sellers from the early 19th century to the present | |
| Canadian Drilling Rig Museum | Rainham Centre | Haldimand County | Golden Horseshoe | Industry | History of the early natural gas fields of Haldimand, Norfolk and Southern Ontario | |
| Canadian Firefighters Museum | Port Hope | Northumberland | Central | Firefighting | Includes vehicles, fire hydrants, working municipal fire alarm system, photo displays, helmets, turnout gear and tools of the trade | |
| Canadian Football Hall of Fame | Hamilton | Hamilton | Golden Horseshoe | Sports | Great achievements in Canadian football | |
| Canadian Forces Museum of Aerospace Defense | North Bay | Nipissing District | Northeastern | Military | Evolution of air defence and the contributions Canadians have made, includes NORAD exhibit, located at CFB North Bay | , |
| Canadian Golf Hall of Fame and Museum | Oakville | Halton Region | Golden Horseshoe | Sports | Canada's golf heritage, featuring famous players, courses and golf technology | |
| Canadian Medical Hall of Fame | London | Middlesex County | Southwestern | Medical | Honours Canadians who have contributed to the understanding of disease and improving the health of people | |
| Canadian Military Heritage Museum | Brantford | County of Brant | Golden Horseshoe | Military | Includes weapons, uniforms, medals, models and artifacts | |
| Canadian Museum of Indian Civilization | Richmond Hill | York Region | Golden Horseshoe | Religious | Essence of Hinduism in North America | |
| Canadian Peace Museum | Bancroft | Hastings County | Eastern | Peace museum | Peace-related efforts | |
| Canadian Transportation Museum & Heritage Village | Kingsville | Essex County | Southwestern | Multiple | Includes village with late over 20 heritage buildings from the 18th century up to the late 1920s, and the museum with antique, vintage and hot rod cars and trucks | |
| Canadian Warplane Heritage Museum | Hamilton | Hamilton | Golden Horseshoe | Aerospace | Military aircraft | |
| Cannington Historical Museum | Cannington | Durham Region | Central | Open air | Includes two log houses, a railway station and caboose, a meeting hall and a driving shed | |
| Carleton Place and Beckwith Heritage Museum | Carleton Place | Lanark County | Eastern | Local history | Local history and culture | |
| Carman House Museum | Iroquois | Stormont, Dundas and Glengarry | Eastern | Living | 1835 period Loyalist house | |
| Castle Kilbride | Baden | Waterloo Region | Golden Horseshoe | Historic house | Late 19th-century Victorian house | |
| Centennial Museum of Sheguiandah | Sheguiandah | Manitoulin District | Northeastern | Local history | | |
| Centennial Park | Thunder Bay | Thunder Bay District | Northwestern | Forestry | Features a museum and recreation of a 1910 logging camp, including train | |
| Central Manitoulin Pioneer Museum | Mindemoya | Manitoulin District | Northeastern | History | Operated by the Central Manitoulin Historical Society; includes a log home, blacksmith shop, barn and equipment, milk processing and butter making equipment and ice harvesting tools | |
| Champlain Trail Museum and Pioneer Village | Pembroke | Renfrew County | Eastern | Open air | Operated by the Ottawa Valley Historical Society | |
| Chapleau Centennial Museum | Chapleau | Sudbury District | Northeastern | Local history | Features a variety of local artifacts, a steam locomotive, monuments and models of local landmarks | |
| Chapple Museum | Chapple | Rainy River District | Northwestern | Local history | | |
| Chatham Railroad Museum | Chatham–Kent | Chatham-Kent | Southwestern | Railroad | Early railroad equipment, located in a baggage car | |
| Chatham-Kent Black Historical Society | Chatham-Kent | Chatham-Kent | Southwestern | African American | W.I.S.H. Centre features exhibits about black history and historic sites in the area | |
| Chatham-Kent Museum | Chatham-Kent | Chatham-Kent | Southwestern | History | Local history including artifacts from the War of 1812, a Gray Dort automobile, horse-drawn vehicles, and a mummy | |
| Chesterville Heritage Centre | Chesterville | Stormont, Dundas and Glengarry | Eastern | History | Local history | |
| Chiefswood National Historic Site | Ohsweken | County of Brant | Golden Horseshoe | Historic house | Mid-19th-century birthplace home of Pauline Johnson, a First Nations author and performer | |
| Christ Church Community Museum | Lakefield | Peterborough County | Central | History | Local history | |
| City of Waterloo Museum | Waterloo | Waterloo Region | Midwestern | Civic | Local history; collection was relocated from the Seagram Museum | |
| Clarke Museum | Kirby | Durham Region | Central | History | Operated by the Clarington Museums, includes local history displays, one-room schoolhouse, blacksmith shop, agricultural equipment | |
| Cloyne & District Historical Society Pioneer Museum | Cloyne | Lennox and Addington County | Eastern | History | Historic artifacts including tools, clothing, kitchen and other household effects | |
| Cobalt Firefighters Museum | Cobalt | Timiskaming District | Northeastern | Firefighting | | |
| Cobalt Mining Museum | Cobalt | Timiskaming District | Northeastern | Mining | Silver mining | |
| Cochrane Railway and Pioneer Museum | Cochrane | Cochrane District | Northeastern | Railway | Includes railroad, local history exhibits | |
| Coldwater Canadiana Heritage Museum | Coldwater | Simcoe County | Central | Open air | Includes 1830s log cabin homestead with historic furnishings and household items, replica general store and post office, display barn, blacksmith shop, print shop, carriage house and abattoir | |
| Collingwood Museum | Collingwood | Simcoe County | Central | History | Local history including early pioneer life, local settlers, traditional logging practices and pioneer settlement | |
| Comber & District Historical Society Museum | Lakeshore | Essex County | Southwestern | History | Local history | |
| Commanda General Store Museum | Commanda | Parry Sound District | Northeastern | History | 1885 High Victorian store with counters, flooring and goods from 1885 to 1934 | |
| Copper Cliff Museum | Copper Cliff | Greater Sudbury | Northeastern | Historic house | Operated by Greater Sudbury Heritage Museums, turn-of-the-20th-century log cabin mining family home | |
| Cornwall Community Museum | Cornwall | Stormont, Dundas and Glengarry | Eastern | History | Local history | |
| Canada's Penitentiary Museum | Kingston | Frontenac County | Eastern | Prison | Also known as the Correctional Service of Canada Museum, features the history of Kingston Penitentiary, other correctional centres and history of Canada's penitentiary system | |
| Cottonwood Mansion | Selkirk | Haldimand County | Golden Horseshoe | Historic house | Late 19th-century Victorian mansion and period furniture | |
| Country Heritage Park | Milton | Halton Region | Golden Horseshoe | Agriculture | Formerly the Ontario Agricultural Museum, over 30 buildings depict agriculture and rural life over the span of 170 years | |
| Craigleith Heritage Depot | Blue Mountains | Grey County | Central | History | Local history and information centre | |
| Crawford Lake Conservation Area | Campbellville | Halton Region | Golden Horseshoe | First Nations | Features reconstructed 15th-century Iroquoian village and interpretive programs | |
| Cumberland Heritage Village | Cumberland | Ottawa | Eastern | Living | 1920–1930s rural village | |
| Delhi Tobacco Museum and Heritage Centre | Delhi | Norfolk County | Southwestern | Local history | Includes the agricultural and cultural development of the area | |
| Diefenbunker Museum | Carp | Ottawa | Eastern | Military | Cold War bunker for the Canadian government | |
| Dionne Quints Museum | North Bay | Nipissing District | Northeastern | Biographical | Birthplace and childhood home of the Dionne quintuplets | |
| Discovery North Bay | North Bay | Nipissing District | Northeastern | History | Formerly the North Bay Area Museum, local history | |
| Discovery Harbour | Penetanguishene | Simcoe County | Central | Open air | Recreated 19th-century community with replica ships and smaller vessels, historic buildings, and an original officers' quarters | |
| Donald Hughes Annex Museum | Ailsa Craig | Middlesex County | Southwestern | Local history | Operated by the North Middlesex Historical Society | |
| Doon Heritage Village | Kitchener | Waterloo Region | Golden Horseshoe | Living | 1914 rural life | |
| Dorothy’s House Museum | Port Hope | Northumberland | Central | Historic house | operated by the East Durham Historical Society, 19th-century Victorian worker's cottage, open seasonally | |
| Dorset Heritage Museum | Dorset | Muskoka | Central | History | Local history including early pioneer life, local settlers, traditional logging practices and pioneer settlement | |
| Dryden & District Museum | Dryden | Kenora District | Northwestern | Local history | Artifacts related to the history and heritage of the Dryden area | |
| Duke Hunt Museum | Thunder Bay | Thunder Bay District | Northwestern | History | Originally known as the Paipoonge Museum, located in Oliver Paipoonge, early settler household artifacts, and community life | |
| Dundas Museum and Archives | Dundas | Hamilton | Golden Horseshoe | History | Local history | |
| Dundurn Castle | Hamilton | Hamilton | Golden Horseshoe | Historic house | 40 room 19th-century estate of Sir Allan Napier MacNab, one of Canada's first premiers; grounds include Hamilton Military Museum | |
| Durham Art Gallery | Durham | Grey County | Southwestern | Art | | |
| Dynamic Earth | Sudbury | Greater Sudbury | Northeastern | Mining | Geology and mining for nickel and gold | |
| Ear Falls Museum | Ear Falls | Kenora District | Northwestern | Local history | Area's aboriginal peoples, gold mining and lumbering industries and transportation | |
| Edinburgh Square Heritage and Cultural Centre | Cayuga | Haldimand County | Golden Horseshoe | Local history | Includes original 1857 jail cell and gypsum mining exhibits | |
| Egyptian Museum of Mississauga | Mississauga | Golden Horseshoe | Golden Horseshoe | Archaeology | Focuses on Egyptian history from Ancient Egyptian to Coptic, back 7,000 years | |
| Eldon House | London | Middlesex County | Southwestern | Historic house | 19th-century period mansion and gardens | |
| Elgin County Museum | St. Thomas | Elgin County | Southwestern | Local history | Promotes Elgin County’s historical and agricultural heritage | |
| Elgin County Railway Museum | St. Thomas | Elgin County | Southwestern | Railway | Railroad engines, cars and equipment, located in former Michigan Central Railroad locomotive shops from 1913 | |
| Elgin Military Museum | St. Thomas | Elgin County | Southwestern | Military | Canadian military history of Elgin County and its residents | |
| Elliot Lake Nuclear and Mining Museum | Elliot Lake | Algoma District | Northeastern | Mining | Area's uranium mining history including the Canadian Mining Hall of Fame, also nuclear power, minerals, local history, logging, wildlife, marine artifacts | |
| Elman W. Campbell Museum | Newmarket | York Region | Central | Local history | Educational activities for all ages | |
| Englehart & Area Museum | Englehart | Timiskaming District | Northeastern | Local history | Also art exhibits | |
| Erland Lee Museum | Stoney Creek | Hamilton | Golden Horseshoe | Historic house | Late 19th-century period Victorian home, recognized as the birthplace of the first Women's Institutes | |
| Ermatinger-Clergue National Historic Site | Sault Ste. Marie | Algoma District | Northeastern | Historic house | 19th-century period house and summer kitchen, and turn-of-the-20th-century blockhouse and gardens | |
| Essex County Steam & Gas Engine Museum | McGregor | Essex County | Southwestern | Agriculture | Antique engines, tractors and farm machinery | |
| Fairfield Museum | Thamesville | Chatham-Kent | Southwestern | Local history | | |
| Fairfield-Gutzeit House | Bath | Lennox and Addington County | Eastern | Historic house | Victorian period house | |
| Fanshawe Pioneer Village | London | Middlesex County | Southwestern | Living | 19th-century village with over 30 original and replica buildings on 46 acres (190,000 m^{2}) | |
| Farmtown Park | Stirling | Hastings County | Central | Agriculture | Previously known as Hastings County Museum of Agricultural Heritage; includes cheese factory, barn display, farm machinery, steam engines and tractors, and an indoor 1930s–1940s heritage village display with period stores | |
| Fashion History Museum | Cambridge | Waterloo Region | Golden Horseshoe | Themed collections | 10,000 historical garments and accessories dating from the mid-18th century to the present | |
| Fieldcote Memorial Park & Museum | Ancaster | Hamilton | Golden Horseshoe | Multiple | Local history and art exhibits | |
| Flour Mill Museum | Sudbury | Greater Sudbury | Northeastern | Historic house | Operated by Greater Sudbury Heritage Museums, early 20th-century house and log cabin | |
| Forest City Gallery | London | Middlesex County | Southwestern | Art | Artist-run centre for contemporary practices in visual/media arts, performance, literature and music | |
| Forest-Lambton Museum | Forest | Lambton County | Southwestern | Local history | 1890s period rooms, local history, natural history, military and doll displays | |
| Fort Erie | Fort Erie | Niagara Region | Golden Horseshoe | Military | Restored War of 1812 period fort | |
| Fort Erie Historical Museum | Ridgeway | Niagara Region | Golden Horseshoe | Local history | Housed in the 1874 Bertie Township Hall | |
| Fort Erie Railroad Museum | Ridgeway | Niagara Region | Golden Horseshoe | Railway | Features a steam engine, historic railway station, area railroad history and artifacts | |
| Fort Frances Museum | Fort Frances | Rainy River District | Northwestern | Local history | Includes natural history, First Nations, fur traders, pioneers, forest industry, community development and growth, art exhibits | |
| Fort George National Historic Site | Niagara-on-the-Lake | Niagara Region | Golden Horseshoe | Military | Restored War of 1812 period fort with living history demonstrations | |
| Fort Henry National Historic Site | Kingston | Frontenac County | Eastern | Military | 19th-century British military fortress with costumed interpreters | |
| Fort Malden National Historic Site | Amherstburg | Essex County | Southwestern | Military | Restored fort buildings and exhibits about the War of 1812, the Rebellion of 1837 and 19th-century soldiers' lives | |
| Fort St. Joseph National Historic Site | St. Joseph Island | Algoma District | Northeastern | Military | Ruins of a War of 1812 fort, exhibits about the site's military history | |
| Fort Wellington National Historic Site | Prescott | Leeds and Grenville | Eastern | Military | Restored 1846 period fort with living history demonstrators | |
| Fort William Historical Park | Thunder Bay | Thunder Bay District | Northwestern | Living | Reconstructed 1815 fur trading post | |
| Forwarders' Museum | Prescott | Leeds and Grenville | Eastern | Transportation | History of the forwarding of goods in the area before the construction of the Saint Lawrence Seaway | |
| Founders' Museum & Pioneer Village | Thunder Bay | Thunder Bay District | Northwestern | Open air | Pioneer village with buildings from different periods, located in Oliver Paipoonge | |
| Foyer Gallery | Kanata | Ottawa | Eastern | Art | Artist-run gallery for regional art, located in the Nepean Sportsplex | |
| Franco-Ontarian Folklore Centre | Sudbury | Greater Sudbury | Northeastern | Ethnic | Trades and traditions of pioneers, antique musical instruments and the daily life of the first French-Canadian settlers information, heritage of the Franco-Ontarian settlers | (in French) |
| Frederick Horsman Varley Art Gallery | Markham | York Region | Central | Art | Located in the historic house of artist Frederick Varley | |
| Frontenac County Schools Museum | Kingston | Frontenac County | Eastern | Education | One-room rural school house from the 1900–1930 era | |
| Fulford Place | Brockville | Leeds and Grenville | Eastern | Historic house | Edwardian-era mansion, operated by Ontario Heritage Trust | |
| Galerie du Nouvel-Ontario | Sudbury | Greater Sudbury | Northeastern | Art | Focus is contemporary art by Franco-Ontarian artists | |
| Gallery of Early Canadian Flight | Wiarton | Bruce County | Southwestern | Aviation | Airplane models and photos, artist's prints, and posters of many of the historic moments in Canada's aviation history, located at Wiarton Airport | |
| Gallery Stratford | Stratford | Perth County | Southwestern | Art | Exhibitions of local, national and international visual artists | |
| Garrison Petawawa Museum Collection | Petawawa | Renfrew County | Eastern | Military | Complex includes the Canadian Airborne Forces Museum about the history of The Canadian Airborne Regiment, and the CFB Petawawa Military Museum with exhibits about the history of CFB Petawawa | |
| Georgian College Campus Gallery | Barrie | Simcoe County | Central | Art | Part of Georgian College in the Helen and Arch Brown Centre for Visual Art | |
| Georgina Military Museum | Keswick | York Region | Golden Horseshoe | Military | Features the involvement of people of Georgina in Canadian wartime conflicts | |
| Georgina Pioneer Village & Archives | Keswick | York Region | Golden Horseshoe | Open air | Includes a log house, church, schoolhouse, general store, train station, blacksmith shop and apothecary | |
| Gibson Gallery | Amherstburg | Essex County | Southwestern | Art | located in an 1896 former railroad station | |
| Glanmore National Historic Site | Belleville | Hastings County | Central | Historic house | 1890s period mansion | |
| Glengarry Pioneer Museum | Dunvegan | Stormont, Dundas and Glengarry | Eastern | Open air | Twelve 19th-century wooden buildings (including the oldest still-functioning bar in Ontario) in a rural setting, with historic tools and artifacts, farm equipment and machinery, furniture, household items, clothing and fabrics | |
| Glengarry Sports Hall of Fame | Maxville | Stormont, Dundas and Glengarry | Eastern | Sports | Achievements of Glengarry County's athletes | |
| Glenhyrst Art Gallery of Brant | Brantford | County of Brant | Golden Horseshoe | Art | Contemporary art | |
| Gore Bay Museum | Gore Bay | Manitoulin District | Northeastern | Local history | Also art exhibits, operated by the Western Manitoulin Historical Society | |
| Goulbourn Museum | Stittsville | Ottawa | Eastern | Local history | Includes 19th- and 20th-century rural township life | |
| Great War Flying Museum | Brampton | Peel Region | Golden Horseshoe | Aviation | Features flying replicas of World War I aircraft | |
| Grey Roots Museum and Archives | Georgian Bluffs | Grey County | Southwestern | Local history | Open air heritage village in summer | |
| Griffin House (Ancaster) | Ancaster | Hamilton | Golden Horseshoe | Historic house | Owned and operated by the Hamilton Conservation Authority, 19th-century period home, part of the Underground Railroad | |
| Grimsby Museum | Grimsby | Niagara Region | Golden Horseshoe | Local history | Travelling exhibitions and a collection of local artefacts | |
| Grimsby Public Art Gallery | Grimsby | Niagara Region | Golden Horseshoe | Art | non-profit public art gallery, featuring exhibitions of contemporary artwork | |
| Guelph Civic Museum | Guelph | Wellington County | Southwestern | Local history | Local and natural history | |
| Guinness World Records | Niagara Falls | Niagara Region | Golden Horseshoe | Amusement | | |
| Haileybury Heritage Museum | Haileybury | Timiskaming District | Northeastern | Local history | includes a streetcar, fire pumper, tugboat and caboose | , |
| Haldimand County Museum & Archives | Cayuga | Haldimand County | Golden Horseshoe | Local history | | |
| Haliburton Highlands Museum | Haliburton | Haliburton County | Central | Local history | Includes local history museum, log barn and pioneer house | |
| Haliburton Sculpture Forest | Haliburton | Haliburton County | Central | Art | Outdoor sculpture park | |
| Halton County Radial Railway | Milton | Halton Region | Golden Horseshoe | Transport | Includes electric streetcars, other railway vehicles, trolleybusses and buses | |
| Halton Region Museum | Milton | Halton Region | Golden Horseshoe | Local history | | |
| Hamilton Children's Museum | Hamilton | Hamilton | Golden Horseshoe | Children's | interactive, hands-on galleries encouraging learning through self-directed play | |
| Hamilton Military Museum | Hamilton | Hamilton | Golden Horseshoe | Military | Canada's military history since the War of 1812; located on the ground of Dundurn Castle | |
| Hamilton Museum of Steam & Technology | Hamilton | Hamilton | Golden Horseshoe | Technology | 19th-century waterworks pumping station with two 45-foot (14 m) high, 70-ton steam engines | |
| Hammond Museum of Radio | Guelph | Wellington County | Southwestern | Media | Radios designed and manufactured in Canada, early radio and wireless artifacts, receivers and transmitters | |
| Hastings and Prince Edward Regiment Museum | Belleville | Hastings County | Central | Military | Regimental uniforms, history and memorabilia | |
| Heritage House Museum | Smiths Falls | Lanark County | Eastern | Historic house | Mid-19th-century period Victorian home | |
| Heritage Schoolhouse | Markham | York Region | Central | Education | 19th-century schoolhouse museum | |
| Hermitage and Gatehouse Museum | Ancaster | Hamilton | Golden Horseshoe | History | History of the ruins of the 19th-century house | |
| Highlands Cinemas and Movie Museum | Kinmount | Kawartha Lakes | Central | Media | Small 5-screen movie theater and museum about movies, motion picture projectors and associated paraphernalia | |
| Hillary House, The Koffler Museum of Medicine | Aurora | York Region | Golden Horseshoe | Medical | 19th-century house used as an office by three generations of doctors, features medical instruments, books, papers, household furnishings, and equipment dating from the early 19th to the late 20th century; operated by the Aurora Historical Society | |
| Historic Cornwall Jail | Cornwall | Stormont, Dundas and Glengarry | Eastern | Prison | Includes cell blocks, common areas, exercise yard and visitation area | |
| HMCS Haida National Historic Site | Hamilton | Hamilton | Golden Horseshoe | Maritime | Tribal-class destroyer museum ship | |
| Hoch Farm | Killaloe, Hagarty and Richards | Renfrew County | Eastern | Historic house | 1910–1920s period farmhouse | |
| Homer Watson House & Gallery | Kitchener | Waterloo Region | Golden Horseshoe | Art | Gallery in former home of artist Homer Watson | |
| Homewood Museum | Maitland | Leeds and Grenville | Eastern | Historic house | 19th-century stone house, one of Ontario’s oldest houses | |
| Horseless Carriage Museum | Fenelon Falls | Kawartha Lakes | Central | Automobile | Early automobiles and truck, engines and other memorabilia | |
| Humphrey Museum | Seguin | Parry Sound District | Northeastern | History | 1870s log schoolhouse with displays of pioneer history, also known as Seguin Township Museum | |
| Huron County Museum | Goderich | Huron | Southwestern | Local history | Furniture, agriculture, salt industry, area art and military displays | |
| Huron Historic Gaol | Goderich | Huron | Southwestern | Prison | County jail from 1841 to 1972, courtrooms and early 20th-century period governor's house | |
| Huronia Museum | Midland | Simcoe County | Central | Multiple | Includes the 16th-century period Huron Oendat Village, native art and archaeological collections, contemporary art gallery, local history and maritime exhibits, period room and general store displays | |
| Hutchison House Museum | Peterborough | Peterborough County | Central | Living | Operated by the Peterborough Historical Society, depicts 19th-century life in Ontario | |
| Hymers Museum | Kakabeka Falls | Thunder Bay District | Northwestern | History | Local history and area's settlers, exhibits include mining, logging, farming, one-room schools, and the village's first church | |
| Ignace Tourist and Information Centre | Ignace | Kenora District | Northwestern | Local history | Also known as the Dennis Smyk Heritage Centre, features the history of the area | |
| Ingersoll Cheese & Agricultural Museum | Ingersoll | Oxford | Southwestern | History | Includes replica 20th-century cheese factory, a barn, local sports hall of fame, a working blacksmith shop and the Ingersoll Community Museum | |
| Ireland House | Burlington | Halton Region | Golden Horseshoe | Historic house | Homestead furnished for three periods: 1850s, 1890s and 1920s | |
| Iron Bridge Historical Museum | Iron Bridge | Algoma District | Northeastern | Local history | | |
| Iroquois Falls Pioneer Museum | Iroquois Falls | Cochrane District | Northeastern | Local history | | |
| Jack Seabrook's Farm Museum | Mindemoya | Manitoulin District | Northeastern | Agriculture | Tractors, farm equipment and tools | |
| Jet Aircraft Museum | London | Middlesex County | Southwestern | Aviation | Focus is Canadian Forces jet aircraft | |
| John Freeman Walls Historic Site | Lakeshore | Essex County | Southwestern | Open air | 20-acre (81,000 m2) historical site that features historic buildings and was part of the Underground Railroad | |
| John R. Park Homestead and Conservation Area | Harrow | Essex County | Southwestern | Historic house | 1850s house and farm buildings | |
| Joseph Brant Museum | Burlington | Halton Region | Golden Horseshoe | Local history | Reconstructed early 19th-century home of Joseph Brant features local history exhibits | |
| Kanata Civic Art Gallery | Kanata | Ottawa | Eastern | Art | exhibits and promotes the sale of original works of art by its members | |
| Kawartha Art Gallery | Lindsay | Kawartha Lakes | Central | Art | | |
| Kawartha Settlers' Village | Bobcaygeon | Kawartha Lakes | Central | Open air | historic homes and buildings from 1830 to 1915 | |
| Kay-Nah-Chi-Wah-Nung | Stratton | Rainy River District | Northwestern | First Nations | Exhibits about the culture of the Ojibway people, tours of Manitou mounds | |
| Keith M. Boyd Museum | Russell | Prescott and Russell | Eastern | Local history | Operated by the Russell Historical Society | |
| Killarney Museum | Killarney | Sudbury District | Northeastern | Local history | | |
| King Township Museum | King City | York Region | Golden Horseshoe | Local history | Located in a historic railroad station and church | |
| Kingsville Historical Park | Kingsville | Essex County | Southwestern | Military | Includes the Charlie Campbell Museum of local military history and artifacts, and a restored 19th-century range light | |
| Kitchener-Waterloo Art Gallery | Kitchener | Waterloo Region | Golden Horseshoe | Art | emphasis is contemporary art | |
| Komoka Railway Museum | Komoka | Middlesex County | Southwestern | Railway | Housed in a 19th-century Canadian National Railway station, railroad artifacts and memorabilia | |
| Lake of the Woods Museum | Kenora | Kenora District | Northwestern | Local history | themes include First Nations, fur traders, pioneer life, area industries and development | |
| Lambton Heritage Museum | Lambton | Lambton County | Southwestern | Multiple | local history, pressed glass, agriculture equipment, antique vehicles and engines, late 19th-century pioneer home, school and blacksmith shop | |
| Lanark and District Museum | Lanark | Lanark County | Eastern | Local history | | |
| Lang Pioneer Village Museum | Peterborough | Peterborough County | Central | Living | 19th-century pioneer village | |
| Latcham Art Centre | Stouffville | York Region | Central | Art | contemporary art and education programs | |
| Laura Secord Homestead | Queenston | Niagara Region | Golden Horseshoe | Historic house | Early 19th-century period home of Laura Secord, a Canadian heroine of the War of 1812 | |
| Lennox and Addington County Museum and Archives | Napanee | Lennox and Addington County | Eastern | Local history | Operated by Lennox and Addington County | |
| Lincoln Museum & Cultural Centre | Jordan | Niagara Region | Golden Horseshoe | Historic house | Depicts early lives of the Loyalists and Pennsylvania Mennonites; includes 1835 period historic house with textiles and weaving displays, and a 1908 period schoolhouse | |
| Lithuanian Museum-Archives of Canada | Mississauga | Peel Region | Golden Horseshoe | Ethnic | Collection and preservation of materials related to the lives, activities, history and culture of Lithuanians in Canada | |
| Little Claybelt Homesteaders Museum | New Liskeard | Timiskaming District | Northeastern | Local history | Local history and pioneer life in the area from the 1880s through the 1940s | |
| Little Schoolhouse and Museum | South Baymouth | Manitoulin District | Northeastern | Local history | Local history and one-room school exhibits | |
| Lockmaster's House Museum | Chaffey's Lock | Leeds and Grenville | Eastern | Transportation | Local history exhibits, history of the Rideau Canal, located in a historic lockmaster's house | |
| London Children’s Museum | London | Middlesex County | Southwestern | Children's | | |
| L'Orignal Jail | L'Orignal | Prescott and Russell | Eastern | Prison | Tours of the prison built in the 1820s and decommissioned in 1998 | |
| Lorne Scots Regimental Museum | Brampton | Peel Region | Golden Horseshoe | Military | Regimental memorabilia | |
| Lost Villages Museum | Long Sault | Stormont, Dundas and Glengarry | Eastern | Open air | Features buildings, photos and memorabilia of The Lost Villages; complex includes a general store, train station, log house, barber shop, school, church and home | |
| Louis Tussaud's Waxworks | Niagara Falls | Niagara Region | Golden Horseshoe | Wax | Full-size figures of celebrities, historic figures and movie characters | |
| Lucan Area Heritage & Donnelly Museum | Lucan | Middlesex County | Southwestern | Local history | Exhibits feature area settlers and the infamous Donnelly tragedy | |
| Lynde House Museum and Warren General Store | Whitby | Durham County | Central | Gardens and local history | | |
| Macaulay Heritage Park | Picton | Prince Edward County | Central | Historic house | includes 1850s period home, historic church with local history museum | |
| Mackenzie Printery & Newspaper Museum | Queenston | Niagara Region | Golden Horseshoe | Media | reconstructed home of rebel publisher William Lyon Mackenzie, displays of 500 years of printing technology | |
| MacLachlan Woodworking Museum | Kingston | Frontenac County | Eastern | Technology | 19th-century life and technology, especially woodworking | |
| MacLaren Art Centre | Barrie | Simcoe County | Central | Art | Mostly contemporary art exhibits, with a replica of Rodin's The Thinker outside | |
| Madonna House Apostolate | Combermere | Renfrew County | Eastern | History | Catholic Christian community, includes the Pioneer Museum with historic tools, household items and agriculture equipment | |
| Maidstone Bicentennial Museum | Lakeshore | Essex County | Southwestern | Local history | Includes a collection of WW1 Naval and Army artifacts, and exhibits of Rum Running, the War of 1812 and others | |
| Maison Macdonell-Williamson House | Chute-à-Blondeau | Prescott and Russell | Eastern | Historic house | Owned by Ontario Heritage Trust, operated by the Friends of the Macdonell-Williamson House, early 19th-century house | |
| Marathon District Museum | Marathon | Thunder Bay District | Northwestern | Local history | | |
| Marie Dressler House | Cobourg | Northumberland | Central | Biographical | Home of actress Marie Dressler, small museum | |
| Marine Museum of the Great Lakes | Kingston | Frontenac County | Eastern | Maritime | Exhibits include shipbuilding, boat building, shipping, life of a sailor, marine art, natural history and ecology of the Great Lakes, and the museum ship CCGS Alexander Henry | |
| Mariners Park Museum | Milford | Prince Edward County | Central | Open air | Many artifacts from more than 50 shipwrecks in the area | |
| Markham Museum | Markham | York Region | Central | Open air | Buildings include houses, barns, sheds, train station, schoolhouse, general store, church, blacksmith, harness shop, saw mill and cider mill | |
| Marten River Provincial Park | Marten River | Nipissing District | Northeastern | Forestry | Features a replica 19th-century logging camp | |
| Maryboro Lodge | Fenelon Falls | Kawartha Lakes | Central | Local history | also known as the Fenelon Museum | |
| Massey Area Museum | Massey | Sudbury District | Northeastern | Local history | Includes early 20th-century general store display, First Nations artifacts, period rooms, lumbering, farming, mining and mineral displays | |
| Mather-Walls House | Kenora | Kenora District | Northwestern | Historic house | Turn-of-the-20th-century period house, owned by Ontario Heritage Trust, operated in the summer by the Lake of the Woods Historical Society | , |
| Mattawa Museum | Mattawa | Nipissing District | Northeastern | Local history | operated by the Mattawa and District Historical Society | |
| McCrae House | Guelph | Wellington County | Southwestern | Historic house | Late 19th-century period home of poet John McCrae | |
| McDougall Cottage | Waterloo | Waterloo Region | Golden Horseshoe | Historic house | Mid-19th-century Scottish labourer's home | |
| McDougall Mill Museum | Renfrew | Renfrew County | Eastern | Local history | located in a former stone grist mill | |
| McFarland House (Niagara-on-the-Lake, Ontario) | Niagara-on-the-Lake | Niagara Region | Golden Horseshoe | Historic house | Early 19th-century period house | |
| McIntosh Gallery | London | Middlesex County | Southwestern | Art | part of the University of Western Ontario | |
| McMaster Museum of Art | Hamilton | Hamilton | Golden Horseshoe | Art | Part of McMaster University, changing exhibits of historical, modern and contemporary art in five galleries | |
| McMichael Canadian Art Collection | Kleinburg | York Region | Golden Horseshoe | Art | Features paintings by Tom Thomson, the Group of Seven and their contemporaries, and First Nations and Inuit artists | |
| Meaford Museum | Meaford | Grey County | Southwestern | Local history | | |
| Middleville and District Museum | Middleville | Lanark County | Eastern | Local history | Located in an 1860s stone school house | |
| Military Communications and Electronics Museum | Kingston | Frontenac County | Eastern | Military | History of military communications | |
| Miller Museum of Geology | Kingston | Frontenac County | Eastern | Natural history | Part of Queen's University, rocks, minerals, fossils, area geology | |
| Milner Heritage House | Chatham-Kent | Chatham-Kent | Southwestern | Historic house | Turn-of-the-20th-century lifestyle of a successful industrialist and his family | |
| Minden Hills Cultural Centre | Minden Hills | Haliburton County | Central | Multiple | Includes the Agnes Jamieson Gallery with a collection of works by André Lapine; the Minden Hills Museum with historic buildings including a schoolhouse, church, pioneer log home, blacksmith shop, logging camp, agriculture and local history exhibits; and R.D. Lawrence Place with exhibits about the nature activities and writings of RD Lawrence | |
| Mission House Museum & Gallery | Combermere | Renfrew County | Eastern | Multiple | Local history and art | |
| Mississagi Lighthouse | Little Current | Manitoulin District | Northeastern | Maritime | | |
| Mississippi Valley Textile Museum | Almonte | Lanark County | Eastern | Textiles | History of the area's textile industry, modern fiber arts exhibits, textile processes and equipment | |
| Modern Fuel | Kingston | Frontenac County | Eastern | Art | Artist-run contemporary art centre | |
| Moore Museum | Mooretown | Lambton County | Southwestern | Open air | Includes local history exhibits, church, school, fire hall, log cabin, railroad station, Victoria cottage, agriculture hall, blacksmith shop | |
| Morningstar Mill | St. Catharines | Niagara Region | Golden Horseshoe | Open air | Includes historic working grist mill, turbine shed, blacksmith shop, millers house, icehouse, sawmill and barn | |
| Movieland Wax Museum of the Stars | Niagara Falls | Niagara Region | Golden Horseshoe | Wax | Entertainment history | |
| Murney Tower | Kingston | Frontenac County | Eastern | Military | Mid-19th-century martello tower with period exhibits | |
| Murray L. Moore Hydro Museum | Pembroke | Renfrew County | Eastern | Science | Also known as the Pembroke Hydro Museum, operated by Ottawa River Power | |
| Museum of Northern History | Kirkland Lake | Timiskaming District | Northeastern | Sports | At the Sir Harry Oakes Chateau, exhibits of the inner workings of some of the richest mines in Canadian history | |
| Museum London | London | Middlesex County | Southwestern | Multiple | Art and local history | |
| Museum of Dufferin | Mulmur | Dufferin County | Central | Multiple | Local history exhibits, reconstructed 1918 pioneer home, art exhibits, collectibles | |
| Museum of Health Care | Kingston | Frontenac County | Eastern | Medical | Nursing and history of health care | |
| Museum of Northern History | Kirkland Lake | Timiskaming District | Northeastern | Multiple | Located in the Sir Harry Oakes Chateau, owned by Ontario Heritage Trust, historic house with exhibits about Harry Oakes and area mining, local history, area wildlife and local art exhibits | |
| Museum of Ontario Archaeology | London | Middlesex County | Southwestern | Archaeology | Part of the University of Western Ontario, Ontario's prehistoric past, adjacent reconstructed Neutral Nation village | |
| Museum of Vision Science | Kitchener | Waterloo Region | Golden Horseshoe | Medical | Part of the University of Waterloo, history of vision science, housed in the School of Optometry | |
| Museum on the Boyne | Alliston | Simcoe County | Central | Local history | Includes 1851 log cabin and an 1858 English barn with agriculture equipment | |
| Museum Strathroy-Caradoc | Strathroy-Caradoc | Middlesex County | Southwestern | Local history | located in 34 Frank, which is also home to Strathroy Public Library and the Art Space gallery | |
| Museum of Temporary Art | Victoria Road | City of Kawartha Lakes | Central | Art | housed in a restored Victorian general store, the MTA is a museum of the imagination including collage, painting, evolving installations and found object assemblages | |
| Muskoka Steamships and Discovery Centre | Gravenhurst | Muskoka | Central | Maritime | Includes history of area steamships, wooden boats and luxury hotels, antique and wooden boat models, toys and Muskoka memorabilia | |
| Muskoka Heritage Place | Huntsville | Muskoka | Central | Multiple | Includes the Muskoka Museum, Muskoka Pioneer Village and the Huntsville & Lake of Bays Railway Society's Portage Flyer Train | |
| Muskoka Lakes Museum | Port Carling | Muskoka | Central | Local history | features artifacts and history of Muskoka District | |
| Myrtleville House Museum | Brantford | County of Brant | Golden Horseshoe | Historic house | operated by the Brant Historical Society, restored 1837 homestead with furnishings from 140 years of family life | |
| Nancy Island Historic Site | Wasaga Beach | Simcoe County | Central | Military | Includes artifacts from the 18th-century schooner HMS Nancy, exhibits on the War of 1812 and a lighthouse | |
| Naismith Museum | Almonte | Lanark County | Eastern | Biographical | Life of basketball inventor James Naismith | |
| National Air Force Museum of Canada | Trenton | Hastings County | Central | Aviation | Formerly known as the RCAF Memorial Museum, Royal Canadian Air Force aircraft and artifacts | |
| Nepean Museum | Nepean | Ottawa | Eastern | Local history | | |
| Net Shed Museum | Meldrum Bay | Manitoulin District | Northeastern | Maritime | seafaring and fishing history of the region | |
| Niagara Apothecary | Niagara-on-the-Lake | Niagara Region | Golden Horseshoe | Medical | owned by Ontario Heritage Trust, operated by the Ontario College of Pharmacists, a restored 1869 pharmacy | |
| Niagara Artists Centre | St. Catharines | Niagara Region | Golden Horseshoe | Art | artist-run contemporary art centre | |
| Niagara Children's Museum | Niagara Falls | Niagara Region | Golden Horseshoe | | activities for children's imaginations | |
| Niagara Falls Art Gallery | Niagara Falls | Niagara Region | Golden Horseshoe | Art | | |
| Niagara Falls History Museum | Niagara Falls | Niagara Region | Golden Horseshoe | Local history | formerly the Lundy's Lane Historical Museum, features exhibits on the War of 1812 | |
| Niagara Historical Museum | Niagara-on-the-Lake | Niagara Region | Golden Horseshoe | Local history | | |
| Niagara Military Heritage Centre | Niagara-on-the-Lake | Niagara Region | Golden Horseshoe | Military | History and artifacts of The Lincoln and Welland Regiment | |
| Niagara Pumphouse Visual Arts Centre | Niagara-on-the-Lake | Niagara Region | Golden Horseshoe | Art | features regional art | |
| Niagara Railway Museum | Fort Erie | Niagara Region | Golden Horseshoe | Railway | Founded as the Niagara Falls Railway Museum in 1997, relocated to Fort Erie in 2010. | |
| Niagara Scouting Museum | Niagara Falls | Niagara Region | Golden Horseshoe | Scouting | contains a display of badges, uniforms, and other items related to Scouting | |
| Nipissing Township Museum | Nipissing | Parry Sound District | Northeastern | Local history | Includes pioneer artifacts, reconstructed homes, log church | |
| No. 6 RCAF Dunnville Museum | Dunnville | Haldimand County | Golden Horseshoe | Aviation | history of the No.6 Service Flying Training School in WW II | |
| Norfolk Arts Centre | Simcoe | Norfolk County | Southwestern | Art | also known as Lynnwood National Historic Site, located in the 1851 Lynnwood House | |
| Norfolk County Archives & Eva Brook Donly Museum | Simcoe | Norfolk County | Southwestern | Historic house | Victorian period house, also gallery of local art and history | |
| North Huron Museum | Wingham | Huron | Southwestern | Local history | | |
| North Lanark Regional Museum | Appleton | Lanark County | Eastern | Local history | Includes replicas of a country store and a pioneer log cabin | |
| Northern Ontario Railroad Museum | Capreol | Greater Sudbury | Northeastern | Railway | Railroad cars, equipment, artifacts and memorabilia | |
| Northwestern Ontario Sports Hall of Fame | Thunder Bay | Thunder Bay District | Northwestern | Sports | sports heritage of Northwestern Ontario | |
| Nor'Westers and Loyalist Museum | Williamstown | Stormont, Dundas and Glengarry | Eastern | History | Story of Sir John Johnson and Loyalist followers who settled in town during the American Revolution in 1784, and the North West Company | |
| Norwich and District Museum | Norwich | Oxford | Southwestern | Open air | Includes 1889 Quaker Meeting House, a blacksmith shop, an 1830s saltbox farmhouse, a turn-of-the-20th-century Quaker schoolhouse, and two barns with agricultural and dairy farming displays and equipment | |
| O'Hara Mill Homestead | Madoc | Hastings County | Central | Open air | Includes 19th-century saw mill, 1850 period house, carpenter shop, blacksmith shop, storage sheds, schoolhouse, covered bridge, period livestock barn, mill pond and walking trails and log house | |
| Oak Hall | Niagara Falls | Niagara Region | Golden Horseshoe | Historic house | Mansion's restored Great Hall reception area, the dining room and the living room, and a collection of Niagara Falls art | |
| Oakville Museum | Oakville | Halton Region | Golden Horseshoe | Local history | Historic estate and grounds with local history exhibits | |
| Oil Museum of Canada | Oil Springs | Lambton County | Southwestern | Industry | Petroleum industry artifacts, site of the first commercial oil well in North America | |
| Old Brittania Schoolhouse | Mississauga | Peel Region | Golden Horseshoe | Education | 19th-century one-room schoolhouse | |
| Olde Gaol Museum | Lindsay | Kawartha Lakes | Central | History | Local and Canadian history set in a jail building dating back to the 1860s, operated by the Victoria County Historical Society | |
| Old Mill Heritage Centre and Post Office Museum | Kagawong | Manitoulin District | Northeastern | Multiple | Includes the Kagawong Museum with exhibits on local history, agriculture, military, early sawmills, commercial shipping and fishing, a historic post office museum display, and an art gallery | |
| Old Stone Mill | Delta | Leeds and Grenville | Eastern | Mill | 1810 stone grist mill and adjacent Museum of Industrial Technology with exhibits of early industries of the region including early agricultural equipment | |
| Omàmiwininì Pimàdjwowin | Golden Lake | Renfrew County | Eastern | First Nations | Also known as the Algonquin Way Cultural Centre, heritage of the Algonquins of Pikwàkanagàn First Nation | |
| Ontario Provincial Police Museum | Orillia | Simcoe County | Central | Law enforcement | History of the Ontario Provincial Police | |
| Ontario Regiment Museum | Oshawa | Durham Region | Central | Military | History of The Ontario Regiment (RCAC), includes uniforms, over 80 military vehicles, medals, arms and photographs | |
| Original Hockey Hall of Fame | Kingston | Frontenac County | Eastern | Sports | History of ice hockey | |
| Orillia Museum of Art & History | Orillia | Simcoe County | Central | Multiple | Art and local history | |
| Oshawa Museum | Oshawa | Durham Region | Central | Historic house | Includes late 19th-century Victorian Henry House, local history exhibits | |
| Osgoode Township Museum | Osgoode Township | Ottawa | Eastern | Local history | | |
| Owen Sound Community Waterfront Heritage Centre | Owen Sound | Grey County | Southwestern | Transport | Housed in a Canadian former National Railway Station on the Owen Sound waterfront, focus is the area's maritime, rail and industrial past | |
| Paddy Walker House | Kincardine | Bruce County | Southwestern | Local history | | |
| Palmerston Railway Heritage Museum | Palmerston | Wellington County | Southwestern | Railroad | | |
| Park House Museum | Amherstburg | Essex County | Southwestern | Historic house | 1850s period house and local history exhibits | |
| Parkwood Estate | Oshawa | Durham Region | Central | Historic house | Early 20th-century mansion and estate gardens | |
| Paris Museum and Historical Society | Paris | County of Brant | Golden Horseshoe | Local history | Archives the heritage of Paris, Ontario and the surrounding area | |
| Peel Art Gallery, Museum and Archives | Brampton | Peel Region | Golden Horseshoe | Multiple | Local history museum, art gallery | |
| Pelee Island Heritage Centre | Pelee Island | Essex County | Southwestern | Multiple | local history and natural history | |
| Penetanguishene Centennial Museum | Penetanguishene | Simcoe County | Central | Local history | | |
| Perth Legion Hall of Remembrance | Perth | Lanark County | Eastern | Military | | |
| Perth Museum (Matheson House) | Perth | Lanark County | Eastern | Local history | Includes four 19th-century period rooms of the Roderick Matheson house | |
| Petawawa Research Forest Visitor Centre | Petawawa | Renfrew County | Eastern | Forestry | Forestry and natural history exhibits, demonstration forest | |
| Petawawa Heritage Village | Petawawa | Renfrew County | Eastern | Living | Mid-19th-century rural Ontario village | |
| Peterborough Lift Lock | Peterborough | Peterborough County | Central | Transportation | Construction and workings of the Trent Canal | |
| Peterborough Museum & Archives | Peterborough | Peterborough County | Central | Local history | Focus on history local to the Peterborough area | |
| Petroglyphs Provincial Park | Woodview | Peterborough County | Central | First Nations | History and spiritual significance of the park's petroglyphs | |
| Petrolia Discovery | Petrolia | Lambton County | Southwestern | Industry | Early days of the boom of the petroleum industry | |
| Pickering Museum Village | Pickering | Durham Region | Central | Open air | 19th-century village | |
| Pinhey's Point Historic Site | Dunrobin | Ottawa | Eastern | Historic house | 19th-century estate home and park | |
| Polar Bear Habitat | Cochrane | Cochrane District | Northeastern | Open air | includes the Hunta Museum with period business displays and antiques, the Cochrane Classic Riders Snowmobile Museum, a blacksmith shop, doctor's office, farm house, general store, service station and schoolhouse | |
| Port Burwell Marine Museum and Historic Lighthouse | Port Burwell | Elgin County | Southwestern | Maritime | Lighthouse, area maritime and shipbuilding history | |
| Port Colborne Historical & Marine Museum | Port Colborne | Niagara Region | Golden Horseshoe | Open air | Includes historic houses, blacksmith shop, a lighthouse with maritime exhibits, historic vehicles, two mid-19th-century log houses | |
| Port Dover Harbour Museum | Port Dover | Norfolk County | Southwestern | Maritime | Local fishing industry, shipping, sailing, shipwrecks and maritime heritage | |
| Presqu'ile Provincial Park | Brighton | Northumberland | Central | Maritime | Includes the Lighthouse Interpretive Centre and a nature centre | |
| Prince Township Museum | Prince | Algoma District | Northeastern | Local history | | |
| Princess of Wales' Own Regiment Museum | Kingston | Frontenac County | Eastern | Military | History and artifacts of The Princess of Wales' Own Regiment, located in the armoury | |
| Princeton District Museum | Princeton | Oxford County | Southwestern | Local history | Local history and art exhibits | |
| Proctor House Museum | Brighton | Northumberland | Central | Historic house | | |
| Pump House Steam Museum | Kingston | Frontenac County | Eastern | Technology | former water pumping station, exhibits on engines, railroads, steam launch boat and science | |
| R. Tait McKenzie Memorial Museum | Mississippi Mills | Lanark County | Eastern | Art | Located in the Mill of Kintail Conservation Area, life and works by sculptor R. Tait McKenzie | |
| Railcar Museum | Moosonee | Cochrane District | Northeastern | History | | |
| Rails End Gallery & Arts Centre | Haliburton | Haliburton County | Central | Art | Located in Haliburton's rail station, featuring contemporary Canadian art, craft and music by local and regional artists | |
| Railway Museum of Eastern Ontario | Smiths Falls | Lanark County | Eastern | Railway | Historic railway station with railroad locomotives, cars, artifacts and memorabilia | |
| Rainy River District Women's Institute Museum | Emo | Rainy River District | Northwestern | Local history | Local history and pioneer life | |
| Rainy River Railroad Heritage Museum | Rainy River | Rainy River District | Northwestern | Railway | exhibits displayed inside a restored railway passenger car, also features a caboose, restored steam engine and local history exhibits | |
| Raisin River Heritage Centre | St. Andrews | Stormont, Dundas and Glengarry | Eastern | Local history | Operated by the Cornwall Township Historical Society | |
| Rayside-Balfour Museum | Azilda | Greater Sudbury | Northeastern | Local history | Operated by Greater Sudbury Heritage Museums, local history, agriculture, culture | |
| Red Lake Regional Heritage Centre | Red Lake | Kenora District | Northwestern | Local history | Themes include Aboriginal history, gold mining, fur trade, immigration, art exhibits | |
| Reuben R. Sallows Gallery | Goderich | Huron | Southwestern | Art | changing exhibits of early 20th-century photographs | |
| Richmond Hill Heritage Centre | Richmond Hill | York Region | Central | Local history | Exhibits in an 1840s period cottage | |
| Rideau Canal Visitor Centre | Smiths Falls | Lanark County | Eastern | Transportation | canal history and heritage | |
| Rideau District Museum | Westport | Leeds and Grenville | Eastern | Local history | | |
| Ridge House Museum | Ridgetown | Chatham-Kent | Southwestern | Historic house | 1875 period historic house | |
| Ripley's Believe It or Not! | Niagara Falls | Niagara Region | Golden Horseshoe | Amusement | | |
| RiverBrink Art Museum | Queenston | Niagara Region | Golden Horseshoe | Art | Historic house with 18th- and 19th-century Canadian paintings, sculpture and decorative art | |
| Robert Langen Art Gallery | Waterloo | Waterloo Region | Golden Horseshoe | Art | Operated by the Wilfrid Laurier University, focus is contemporary Canadian art | |
| Robert McLaughlin Gallery | Oshawa | Durham Region | Central | Art | Focus is modern and contemporary Canadian art | |
| Rock Legends Wax Museum | Niagara Falls | Niagara Region | Golden Horseshoe | Wax | | |
| Rodman Hall Art Centre | St. Catharines | Niagara Region | Golden Horseshoe | Art | Part of Brock University | |
| Ron Morel Memorial Museum | Kapuskasing | Cochrane District | Northeastern | Railroad | Housed in a steam locomotive, two passenger cars and a caboose, railroad artifacts and model railroad display, also local history exhibits | |
| Ronathahon:ni Cultural Centre | Akwesasne | Stormont, Dundas and Glengarry | Eastern | First Nations | Managed by Native North American Traveling College, culture and history of the Mohawk Nation | |
| Rose House Museum | Waupoos | Prince Edward County | Central | Historic house | Early 19th-century house with furnishings from 5 generations | |
| Ross Museum | Whitewater Region | Renfrew County | Eastern | History | Includes period room and business displays, household items, farming tools, logging equipment | |
| Rotunda Gallery | Kitchener | Waterloo Region | Golden Horseshoe | Art | Municipal art gallery located in Kitchener City Hall | |
| Royal Botanical Gardens | Burlington | Halton Region | Golden Horseshoe | Natural history | Features exhibits about plants, nature and science | |
| Royal Canadian Legion Branch 72 Museum | Pembroke | Renfrew County | Eastern | Military | open by request and for special events, local branch of the Royal Canadian Legion | |
| Royal Canadian Regiment Museum | London | Middlesex County | Southwestern | Military | Regimental history and artifacts | |
| Royal Hamilton Light Infantry Heritage Museum | Hamilton | Hamilton | Golden Horseshoe | Military | Regimental history, open by appointment | |
| Royal Military College of Canada Museum | Kingston | Frontenac County | Eastern | Military | Located in Fort Frederick, history of the college and the naval history of the site | |
| Rydal Bank Community Hall and Church | Plummer Additional | Algoma District | Northeastern | Local history | | |
| Ruthven Park National Historic Site | Cayuga | Haldimand County | Golden Horseshoe | Historic house | 19th-century mansion estate | |
| Sainte-Marie among the Hurons | Midland | Simcoe County | Central | Living | Recreated 17th-century French Jesuit mission headquarters and Wendat Huron inhabitants | |
| Sarah Jane Williams Heritage Centre | Bowmanville | Durham Region | Central | Local history | operated by the Clarington Museums, features exhibits about Dominion Organ and Piano Company, a large doll and toy collection, and changing history exhibits | |
| Sault Ste. Marie Museum | Sault Ste. Marie | Algoma District | Northeastern | Local history | facilitated by the Sault Ste. Marie & 49th Field Regiment R.C.A. Historical Society | |
| Sault Ste. Marie Canal National Historic Site | Sault Ste. Marie | Algoma District | Northeastern | Transport | Visitor center, guided tours of the canal locks | |
| Schneider Haus | Kitchener | Waterloo Region | Golden Horseshoe | Historic house | Early 19th-century period homestead | |
| School House Museum | Deep River | Renfrew County | Eastern | Local history | History of Laurentian Hills | |
| School On Wheels Railcar Museum | Clinton | Huron | Southwestern | Education | Historic school car that traveled the region to bring education to children | |
| Science North | Sudbury | Greater Sudbury | Northeastern | Science | Focuses on geological sciences | |
| Scout Museum Kingston | Kingston | Frontenac County | Eastern | Scouting | scouting artifacts from the 1920s to 2000 | |
| Scugog Shores Museum | Port Perry | Durham Region | Central | Open air | Mid- to late 19th-century village, Ojibway Heritage Interpretive Lands about the natural and cultural history of the Scugog Watershed prior to European settlement | |
| Secrets of Radar Museum | London | Middlesex County | Southwestern | Military | Story of the more than 6,000 Canadian World War II veterans who were recruited into a top-secret project during World War II involving radar | |
| Serbian Heritage Museum | Windsor | Essex County | Southwestern | Local history | Features artifacts from Serbia, mainly from Serbian diaspora in the region. | |
| Sharon Temple National Historic Site | Sharon | York Region | Golden Horseshoe | Open air | Story of the Children of Peace and the early settlers of East Gwillimbury; features the Sharon Temple (1825–1832), the Doan House (1819), David Willson's Study (1829), an 1850s Log House and other buildings on 4.5 acres of park land; operated by the Sharon Temple Museum Society | |
| Sheffield Park Black History & Cultural Museum | Clarksburg | Grey County | Southwestern | History | early Black pioneer families | |
| Sibbald Point Provincial Park | Sutton | York Region | Central | Local history | Features the Sibbald Memorial Museum, a historic house and local history museum (summer months only) | |
| Sifton-Cook Heritage Centre | Cobourg | Northumberland County | Eastern | Local history, historic building | Cobourg history told in annually changing exhibits and outdoor model railway - Victoria Day weekend to Thanksgiving | |
| Simcoe County Museum | Minesing | Simcoe County | Central | Local history | local history and culture, church, schoolhouse, railway station, farm equipment | |
| Sioux Lookout Museum | Sioux Lookout | Kenora District | Northwestern | Local history | Located on the second floor of the Sioux Lookout Heritage Railway Station | |
| Sir John Johnson Manor House | Williamstown | Stormont, Dundas and Glengarry | Eastern | Historic house | Late 18th-century home of Sir John Johnson, 2nd Baronet | |
| Ska-Nah-Doht Village and Museum | Mount Brydges | Middlesex County | Southwestern | First Nations | Recreated longhouse village of 1,000 years ago and museum with archaeological artifacts | |
| Sky Harbour Gallery | Goderich | Huron | Southwestern | Aviation | Located at Goderich Airport, airport history in WW II, county aviation history | |
| Society for the Preservation of Canada's Nuclear Heritage | Deep River | Renfrew County | Eastern | Nuclear Science and Technology | Canadian nuclear history from Ernest Rutherford to the present, including research and development, CANDU, medical and isotope applications, mining, radioactive waste management, and accelerators | |
| Sombra Museum Cultural Centre | Sombra | Lambton County | Southwestern | Local history | Includes Victorian period home and log cabin | |
| South Grey Museum | Flesherton | Grey County | Southwestern | Local history | | |
| Sovereign House | Bronte | Halton Region | Golden Horseshoe | Historic house | Operated by the Bronte Historical Society, 19th-century period house | |
| Spencerville Mill | Spencerville | Leeds and Grenville | Eastern | Mill | Stone grist mill and gardens | |
| St. Catharines Museum and Welland Canals Centre | St. Catharines | Niagara Region | Golden Horseshoe | Multiple | city's history, history and impact of the Welland Canal, Ontario Lacrosse Hall of Fame and Museum, the Underground Railroad and African Canadian heritage | |
| St. Edmunds Township Museum | Tobermory | Bruce County | Southwestern | History | Local and maritime history, also late 19th-century log house open by request | |
| St. Jacobs Mill | St. Jacobs | Waterloo Region | Golden Horseshoe | Multiple | Includes the Maple Syrup Museum, St. Jacobs Quilt Gallery, electricity exhibit, Home Hardware exhibit, model train exhibit | |
| St. Joseph Island Museum | St. Joseph Island | Algoma District | Northeastern | Open air | Complex includes a log cabin, church, school, barn, store | |
| St. Joseph Museum | Zurich | Huron | Southwestern | Local history | Operated by the St. Joseph Historical Society | |
| St. Marys Museum | St. Marys | Perth County | Southwestern | Local history | | |
| St. Thomas-Elgin Public Art Centre | St. Thomas | Elgin County | Southwestern | Art | | |
| Stanhope Heritage Discovery Museum | Stanhope | Haliburton County | Central | Local history | Features pioneer history and artifacts, and includes a log chute | |
| Stephen Leacock Museum | Orillia | Simcoe County | Central | Historic house | Summer home of author and humorist Stephen Leacock, includes exhibits on his life and writings, and a gallery of Canadian writers and art | |
| Stones 'n Bones Museum | Sarnia | Lambton County | Southwestern | Natural history | Fossils, minerals, gemstones, artifacts, shells, butterflies, insects, antlers, horns, dinosaurs | |
| Stratford Perth Museum | Stratford | Perth County | Southwestern | Local history | | |
| Sturgeon River House Museum | Sturgeon Falls | Nipissing District | Northeastern | Local history | Includes fur trading, pioneers, blacksmith shop and ice house | |
| Swords and Ploughshares Museum | Kars | Ottawa | Eastern | Military | Focus is the Citizen Soldier (the Militiaman and Reservist) at peace and at war, features many military trucks and vehicles | |
| Sudbury Region Police Museum | Sudbury | Greater Sudbury | Northeastern | Law enforcement | | |
| Teeterville Pioneer Museum | Teeterville | Norfolk County | Southwestern | History | complex includes a log house, smoke house, wayside church, drive barn and early Windham and area artifacts | |
| Thames Art Gallery | Chatham-Kent | Chatham-Kent | Southwestern | Art | | |
| Thames Valley Museum School | Norwich | Oxford | Southwestern | Education | Early 20th-century rural schoolhouse | |
| Thamesville Old Town Hall Museum | Thamesville | Chatham-Kent | Southwestern | Local history | | |
| Thelma Miles Historical Museum | Matheson | Cochrane District | Northeastern | Local history | | |
| THEMUSEUM | Kitchener | Waterloo Region | Golden Horseshoe | Multiple | Formerly the Waterloo Regional Children's Museum, interactive exhibits for children, changing exhibits of culture, art, history, science | |
| Thomas House (Oakville, Ontario) | Oakville | Halton Region | Golden Horseshoe | Historic house | 1830-1840s period pioneer home, operated by the Oakville Historical Society | |
| Thorold Museum | Thorold | Niagara Region | Golden Horseshoe | Local history | features the Lock 7 Viewing Centre | |
| Thunder Bay Art Gallery | Thunder Bay | Thunder Bay District | Northwestern | Art | Contemporary First Nations art | |
| Thunder Bay Historical Museum | Thunder Bay | Thunder Bay District | Northwestern | Local history | | |
| Thunder Bay Military Museum | Thunder Bay | Thunder Bay District | Northwestern | Military | Northwestern Ontario military history, includes regimental memorabilia of The Lake Superior Scottish Regiment | |
| Timber Village Museum | Blind River | Algoma District | Northeastern | Forestry | lumbering and logging tools, artifacts and equipment | |
| Timmins Museum: National Exhibition Centre | Timmins | Cochrane District | Northeastern | Multiple | local history and art, recreated 1930's miner's home | |
| Tom Thomson Art Gallery | Owen Sound | Grey County | Southwestern | Art | Features a large collection of memorabilia and works from Tom Thomson and the Group of Seven | |
| Treasure Chest Museum | Paisley | Bruce County | Southwestern | History | Antiques and collectibles, tools, household items, lamps, machinery, glassware, crockery, furniture | |
| Tree Museum | Gravenhurst | Muskoka | Central | Art | outdoor sculpture gallery | |
| True North Gallery | Waterdown | Wentworth County | Southern | Art | features original art and limited edition prints by artist-musicians including David Bowie, Buffy Sainte-Marie, and many others. Located in and operated by the owners of True North Records | |
| Tweed and Area Heritage Centre | Tweed | Hastings County | Central | Local history | | |
| Uncle Tom's Cabin Historic Site | Dresden | Chatham-Kent | Southwestern | Open air | Complex includes home of Josiah Henson, former U.S. slave whose life story was the inspiration for the novel Uncle Tom's Cabin | |
| Union Gallery | Kingston | Frontenac County | Eastern | Art | part of Queen's University, contemporary art | |
| United Empire Loyalist Heritage Centre | Adolphustown | Lennox and Addington County | Eastern | History | History of the United Empire Loyalist settlers in the late 18th-century | |
| University of Waterloo Art Galleries | Waterloo | Waterloo Region | Golden Horseshoe | Art | part of the University of Waterloo | |
| Upper Canada Village | Morrisburg | Stormont, Dundas and Glengarry | Eastern | Living | 1860s period village with over 40 buildings | |
| Uxbridge Historical Centre | Uxbridge | Durham Region | Central | Local history | | |
| Vankleek Hill Museum | Vankleek Hill | Prescott and Russell | Eastern | Local history | operated by the Vankleek Hill & District Historical Society | |
| Visual Arts Centre of Clarington | Bowmanville | Durham Region | Central | Art | | |
| Waba Cottage Museum and Gardens | White Lake | Renfrew County | Eastern | Historic house | belongings of Archibald McNab, the founder of McNab Township, with historic log church and schoolhouse | |
| Wallaceburg Museum | Wallaceburg | Chatham-Kent | Southwestern | Local history | | |
| Waterford Heritage & Agricultural Museum | Waterford | Norfolk County | Southwestern | Local history | social history of Waterford and Old Townsend as well as Norfolk County agriculture | |
| Waterloo County Gaol and Governor's House | Kitchener | Waterloo Region | Golden Horseshoe | Historic site | former jail and governor's house with historic and archaeological exhibits in the lobby | |
| Waterloo Region Museum | Kitchener | Waterloo Region | Golden Horseshoe | Local history | Regional history and culture including First Nation's peoples, European settlement, manufacturing heyday, high tech sector, entrance to Doon Heritage Village | |
| Watson's Mill | Manotick | Ottawa | Eastern | Mill | 19th-century flour grist mill | |
| Waverley Place | Bowmanville | Durham Region | Central | Historic house | Formerly the Bowmanville Museum; 1900–1930 period home reflecting the lifestyle of a wealthy merchant family, operated by the Clarington Museums | |
| Welland Historical Museum | Welland | Niagara Region | Golden Horseshoe | Local history | Located in a former Carnegie library building | |
| Wellington County Museum and Archives | Fergus | Wellington County | Southwestern | Multiple | Local history, decorative arts and art | |
| Wellington Heritage Museum | Wellington | Prince Edward County | Central | Local history | | |
| West Parry Sound District Museum | Parry Sound | Parry Sound District | Northeastern | Local history | also known as Museum on Tower Hill, local history, themes include trapping, First Nations, shipping, logging, agriculture and cottaging, features a fire tower to climb | |
| Westfield Heritage Village | Rockton | Hamilton | Golden Horseshoe | Open air | Over 30 historic buildings on a 3.4 square kilometres (840 acres) site | |
| Whitchurch-Stouffville Museum | Vandorf | York Region | Central | History | complex includes an 1880s period farmhouse, 19th-century schoolhouse, log cabin, and local history museum | |
| White Water Gallery | North Bay | Nipissing District | Northeastern | Art | contemporary visual art | |
| Whitehern Historic House and Garden | Hamilton | Hamilton | Golden Horseshoe | Historic house | Mid-19th-century urban estate with elements from the Georgian, Victorian and Edwardian periods | |
| Wilberforce Red Cross Outpost & Historic House | Wilberforce | Haliburton County | Central | Medical | site of the first Red Cross Outpost Hospital in Ontario | |
| Willoughby Historical Museum | Niagara Falls | Niagara Region | Golden Horseshoe | Local history | history of the community of Willoughby | |
| Wilno Heritage Park | Wilno | Renfrew County | Eastern | Ethnic | includes the Polish Kashub Heritage Museum & Skansen, Kashubian and Polish heritage | |
| Wilson MacDonald Memorial School Museum | Selkirk | Haldimand County | Golden Horseshoe | Education | 1925 period one-room schoolhouse, exhibits about poet Wilson MacDonald | |
| Windsor Sculpture Park | Windsor | Essex County | Southwestern | Art | Outdoor sculpture park | |
| Windsor's Community Museum | Windsor | Essex County | Southwestern | Local history | Located downtown in the François Baby House, features artifacts and documents important to the history of Windsor and Essex County | |
| Windsor Wood Carving Museum | Windsor | Essex County | Southwestern | Art | Carved wood art (possibly closed) | |
| Woodchester Villa | Bracebridge | Muskoka | Central | Historic house | Late 19th-century octagon house with local history exhibits | |
| Woodland Cultural Centre | Brantford | County of Brant | Golden Horseshoe | First Nations | History, culture and art of the Anishinaabe and Onkwehon:we | |
| Woodside National Historic Site | Kitchener | Waterloo Region | Golden Horseshoe | Historic house | 1890s Victorian childhood home of Prime Minister William Lyon Mackenzie King | |
| Woodstock Art Gallery | Woodstock | Oxford | Southwestern | History | Changing exhibits and permanent display of works by Florence Carlyle | |
| Woodstock Museum | Woodstock | Oxford | Southwestern | Local history | | |
| Workers Arts & Heritage Centre | Hamilton | Hamilton | Golden Horseshoe | Multiple | Art, culture and heritage of working people in Canada | |
| Youngtown Rock N Roll Museum | Omemee | Kawartha Lakes | Central | Music | Celebration of music from the '50s, '60s and '70s, with large collection of Neil Young and Beatles memorabilia | |

== Defunct museums ==
- Canadian Ski Museum, moved from Ottawa to Mont-Tremblant, Quebec in 2013
- Chesley Heritage & Woodworking Museum, Chesley, closed in 2013
- Clark House Museum, Powassan, closed 2012
- Criminals Hall of Fame, Niagara Falls, closed 2014
- Dairy Museum, Aylmer
- Edison Museum, Vienna, closed 2016
- Elliott Avedon Museum and Archive of Games, closed in 2009, collections now at the Canadian Museum of Civilization
- First Hussars Museum, London
- Guy Lombardo Museum, London, closed in 2007
- Innisville Museum, Innisville, closed 2007
- Jolley's Riding Toy Museum, Meaford, closed 2016
- Kingston Archaeological Centre, Kingston
- Mahoney Dolls House Gallery, Fort Erie, closed 2010
- Memory Junction Railway Museum, Brighton, closed 2018
- MS Norgoma, Sault Ste. Marie, closed 2019
- The Niagara Falls Museum, Niagara Falls
- Personal Computer Museum, Brantford, closed 2018
- Revolution Frères Museum, Moosonee
- Riverview Miniature Village, Peterborough, closed 2014
- Scugog Shores Heritage Centre and Archives, Port Perry, closed 2019
- Seagram Museum, Waterloo
- Shania Twain Centre, Timmins, closed in 2013
- Timmins Underground Gold Mine Tour, Timmins, closed in 2013
- Woodstock Peace Lighthouse, Woodstock, closed circa 2016

== See also ==
- Nature centres in Ontario
