= Congregation B'nai Israel (St. Catharines) =

Synagogue in Ontario, Canada

B'nai Israel
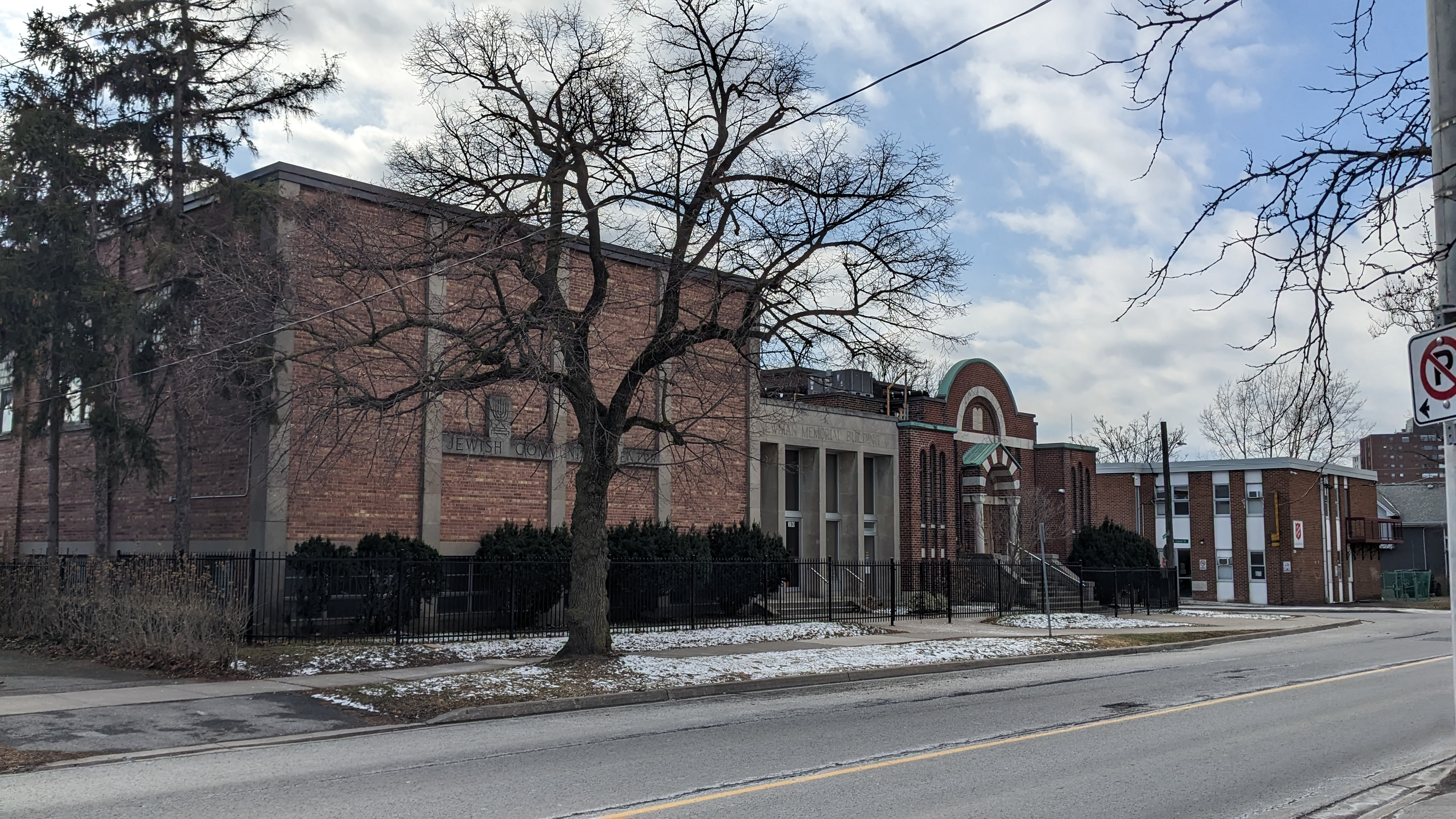

Religion
- Affiliation: Conservative Judaism - Egalitarian
- Leadership: Lay-led
- Year consecrated: 1905
- Status: Active

Location
- Location: 190 Church Street; St. Catharines, Ontario; L2R 4C4
- Interactive map of B'nai Israel
- Coordinates: 43.164043°N 79.236875°W

Website
- www.jewishstcatharines.com

Ontario Heritage Act
- Designated: 2024

Congregation B'nai Israel (Hebrew: בני ישראל) is a Conservative Egalitarian Jewish congregation located in downtown St. Catharines, Ontario, Canada. It is the only Conservative synagogue in the Niagara Region. Founded early in the twentieth century, its synagogue building completed in 1925 is among the oldest standing in Canada.

== History ==
The congregation was established in 1907 and religious gatherings were held in various places. In 1917, a temporary synagogue was built. Shortly afterwards, an architectural firm was commissioned for a permanent synagogue. A friend of a congregation member had to buy the property as the landowners would not sell to Jews. Construction started in 1924 and was completed by 1925. The previous synagogue was then used as the residence for their rabbi.

The congregation has been part of the United Synagogue of Conservative Judaism since 1981. In 1998, the congregation was sued for wrongful dismissal by a former rabbi, who was then compensated $130,000. In 2016, the synagogue was featured in an exhibit at the St. Catharines Museum. In 2024, the building became a heritage site under the Ontario Heritage Act.
