= Amos Wright =

Canadian politician (1809–1886)

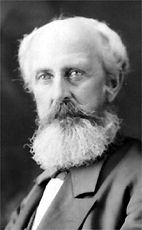
Amos Wright

Amos Wright (November 24, 1809 – March 31, 1886) was a Canadian politician.

== Early life ==
Born in Leeds County, he moved with his family to Richmond Hill, where he seemingly abandoned his education to become a farmer and mill-owner. In 1850 he becomes reeve of Markham Township, but lost in 1854.

In 1857, Wright chaired a meeting which pressed for Richmond Hill's incorporation as a village. This goal, though not immediately achieved, was eventually fulfilled in 1873.

== Parliamentary career ==
From 1852 to 1867, Wright represented East York as a Member of the Legislative Assembly of the Province of Canada, and was noted as an ally of George Brown. Following Confederation, and after William Pearce Howland resigned to become Lieutenant Governor of Ontario, Amos Wright gained his seat in the House of Commons of Canada in a federal by-election on August 14, 1868, and came to represent York West. He retired from politics on July 8, 1872, before the next election.

== Later life ==
In 1875 Wright was appointed Federal Indian Agent and Ontario's Crown Agent for the Thunder Bay area; (Wright resided in the then-named Port Arthur). While his Provincial appointment lasted until 1886, he was involved in a controversy due to an alleged conflict of interest in his Federal capacity of Indian Agent. In this controversy, religious issues are also said to have played a part; in any case, Wright, a Methodist from an essentially Protestant background, was replaced as Federal Indian Agent in 1883.

Amos Wright was active in public life well into his seventies. Known as a well-liked figure with very wide connections, in his political life he was seen as a representative who, particularly in his earlier career, took a nuanced position on some of the key issues of the day: arguably, such a stance at times both smoothed and hindered his political advancement, but his popularity was undoubted. The Toronto Daily Patriot and Express even stated he was "as bewildered with unexpected honors as an interesting widow giving herself away in matrimony for the fourth time". While undoubtedly unfair, this comment serves to hint at the transition which his life encompassed from his early days in farming and involvement in local parish affairs, to the sometimes tumultuous political events of the Federal Parliament, as the new Dominion expanded westward.

He died at Port Arthur on March 31, 1886, and was buried in Richmond Hill.

== Richmond Hill Heritage Centre ==
Amos Wright's house, an 1840s Regency-style dwelling in Church Street, Richmond Hill, Ontario, is designated as Richmond Hill Heritage Centre, adjoining a park named for Wright.

Parliament of Canada
Preceded by William Pearce Howland	Member of Parliament from York West; 1868–1872	Succeeded by David Blain
