= Thelma Walmsley =

Canadian baseball and softball player

Thelma Jo Walmsley (1918–1997) was a Canadian baseball and softball player.

Walmsley played for the Racine Belles of the All-American Girls Professional Baseball League (AAGPBL) in the 1946 season. Prior to her stint with the Racine Belles, Walmsley played for the Montreal Royals of the Montreal Major Ladies' Softball League.

In 1998, Walmsley was one of the Canadian women who played in the AAGPBL who were inducted as a group into the Canadian Baseball Hall of Fame. Her Racine Belles jacket is held in the collection of the Copper Cliff Museum in Walmsley's hometown of Copper Cliff, Ontario.
