= Shania Twain Centre =

Attraction in Timmins, Ontario, Canada

Coordinates: 48.469707°N 81.316734°W

- Established: June 30, 2001
- Dissolved: February 1, 2013
- Location: Timmins, Ontario, Canada
- Type: tourist attraction
- Visitors: 9,151 (2010)
- Owner: City of Timmins

The Shania Twain Centre was a city-owned tourist attraction that operated in Timmins, Ontario, from 2001 to 2013. It exhibited memorabilia, awards and other personal items loaned to the Centre by singer Shania Twain, who was raised in Timmins.

== History ==
The Shania Twain Centre was opened on June 30, 2001.

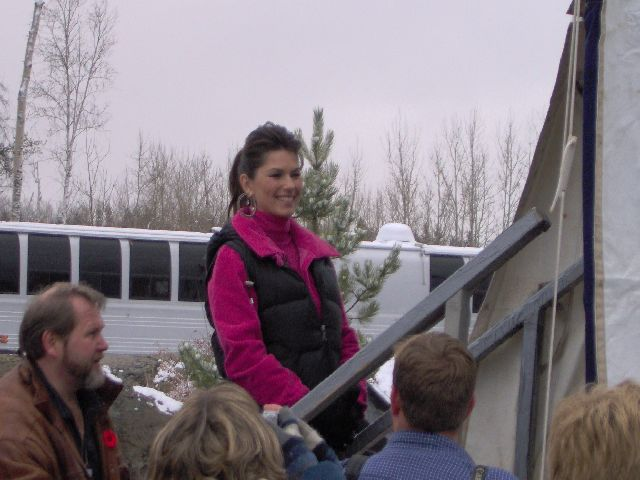
Twain, on November 2, 2005, at homecoming in Timmins, Ontario

On November 2, 2004, Twain visited the Centre and officially declared it open before an audience of hundreds of fans from around the world, some of whom had queued for up to 20 hours for the opportunity of an autograph and greeting with Twain.

=== Annual fan conventions ===
From 2003 to 2012, fans of Shania Twain traveled to Timmins for the International Shania Twain Fan Convention. 32 fans attended in 2003.

At subsequent conventions held each August:

- 2004: Two large gifts from Twain to the Centre were unveiled: the stage from her "Up" tour and her tour bus. Twain band members Cory Churko and JD Blair attended the convention.
- 2005: Approximately 100 fans attended for the year's four-day event. Drummer JD Blair and guitarist Randall Waller participated.
- 2006: Drummer JD Blair and fiddler Allison Cornell attended.
- 2007: 50 fans attended. Events included a karaoke night, a country party, a mini-golf tournament and Go-cart races. Drummer JD Blair and guitarist Randall Waller sent messages.
- 2008-2012: Conventions were held annually. The 2011 convention included fans from the UK, Denmark and the US.

=== Costs to the city ===
Annual attendance for the Centre was originally projected at 50,000 but never reached above 15,000. Annual subsidies to the centre cost the city of Timmins $7 per resident, or $33 per centre visitor. A 2011 financial study suggested that the city council faced either closing the centre or spending $233,000 per year subsidizing its operations.

=== Closing ===
In May 2012, Shania Twain's management company had the singer's items repatriated to Las Vegas, removing most of the Centre's exhibits. In January 2013, Timmins city officials announced plans to sell the Centre building due to declining attendance. The land and building were sold to Goldcorp for $5 million, half the building's $10 million construction cost, as part of Goldcorp's plan to create an open-pit gold mine on the site.

The Centre officially closed on February 1, 2013. Officials stated that items remaining after the centre's closure would be displayed at the city's airport and library. The building was demolished on December 3, 2014.

== See also ==
- List of music museums

== Affiliations ==
The Museum was affiliated with CMA, CHIN, and Virtual Museum of Canada.
