= Backus-Page House Museum =

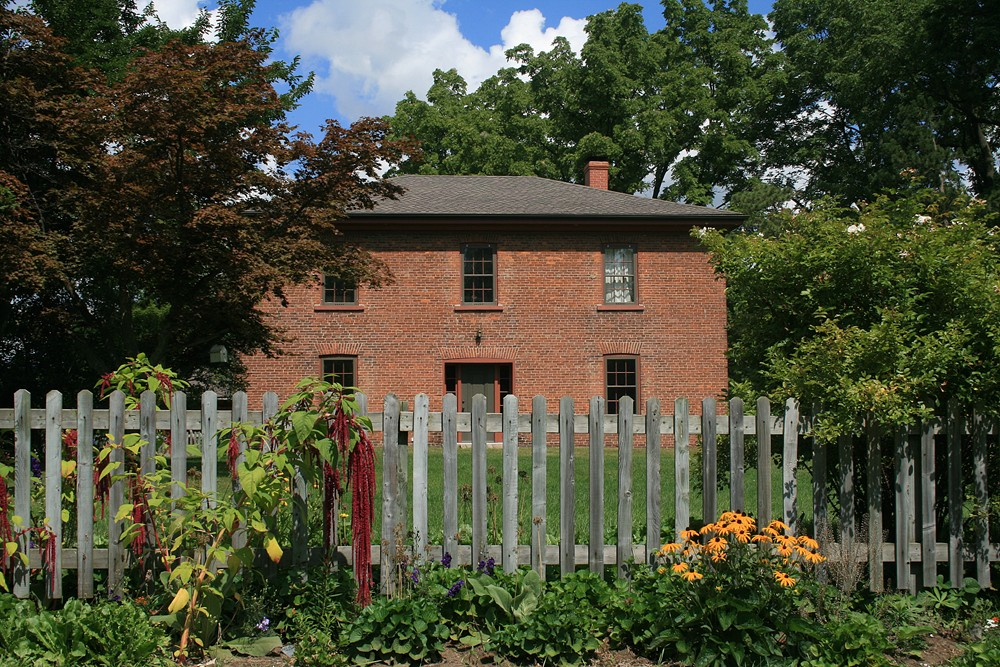
- Backus-Page House Museum, August 2008

- Location of the Backus-Page House Museum in Ontario
- Established: 1994
- Location: Wallacetown, Ontario, Canada
- Coordinates: 42°36′24″N 81°26′46″W
- Type: Historic house museum
- Curator: Lori Milos-Ivanski
- Website: Official website

The Backus-Page House Museum is a living history museum located in the heart of the Talbot Settlement in Wallacetown, Ontario, Canada. The Georgian style house has been restored as closely as possible to its state in 1850. The museum is maintained and run by the Tyrconnell Heritage Society, a local independent organization that is dedicated to restoration and preservation of Backus-Page House and surrounding estate.

== About ==
The Backus-Page House Museum is located within the grounds of the John E. Pearce Provincial Park in the heart of what was once known as the Talbot Settlement. The museum is situated within a restored Georgian style house that was constructed in 1850 by Robert Morris. Morris was responsible for building a number of homes in the area, but this one has particular significance as it was one of the first brick homes built in Dunwich Township.

The house was commissioned by Andrew and Mary Jane Backus. The Backus family was one of several families that had obtained land from Colonel Thomas Talbot and settled in the area that quickly came to be known at Little Tyrconnell (a namesake carried over from Ireland). The property that Andrew built his house on was given to him by his grandmother, Mary Storey, who received her original land grant in 1809.

That the Backuses prospered can be attested to by the quality of the house built (as well as surviving business records), but that did not translate to an opulent lifestyle. Written correspondence from that time seems to indicate that though the house was handsomely built it was plainly appointed. When the Backus family lived within the house it was referred to as Lakeview. The Ministry of Natural Resources has since reforested the area between the house and Lake Erie, but during the Backus era that land was cleared and afforded an excellent view of the shoreline and lake.

The two story red brick Georgian style home was constructed using approximately 72,000 bricks. These were made from clay dug from the field directly behind the house and fired right on the farm property. The bricks were used to build both interior and exterior walls of the house. The walls were built to last, having a width of either four or five bricks.

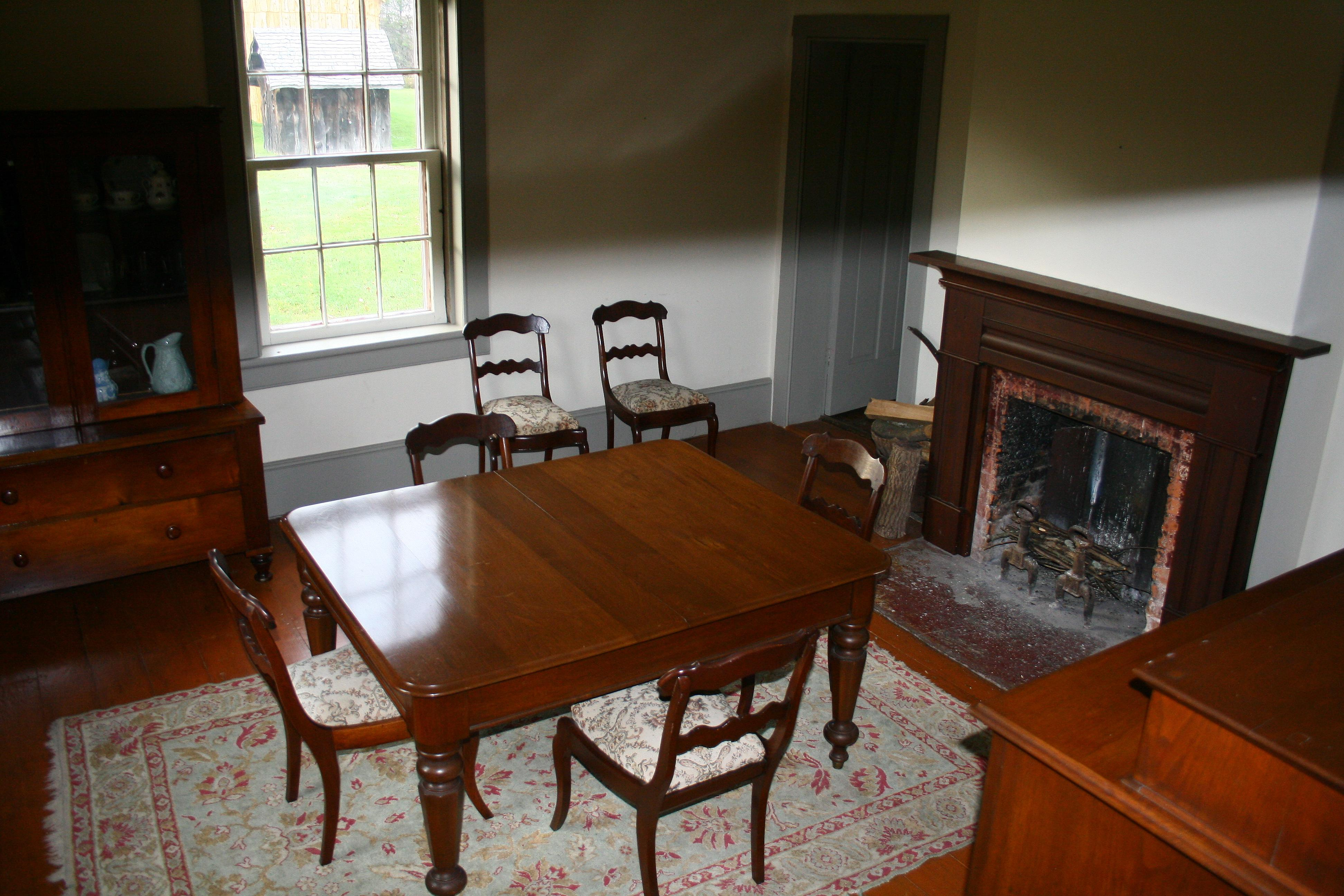
The Backus-Page House dining room

Oak and black ash beams and joists were used in the framing. Much of the lumber, such as pine, ash, and tulip which went into the finishing of the house was harvested from the adjacent woodlands. The house was heated by three main level fireplaces, each with a black walnut mantel and paneling. The fireplaces are no longer operational; however, the cooking crane hardware that presently remains within one indicates it would have done double duty as the original family cooking fire.

The Backus-Page House and property were obtained by Jonas A. Page in 1925 and sold to his son Morley. The Page family had settled in the area in the early 19th century and the family homestead further up Lakeview Line remains in the family to this day. Morley and Grace Page resided on the estate and farmed the property for over 50 years - managing a small dairy herd, producing eggs, pork, beef, cash crops and maple syrup. The house underwent a number of physical changes as it aged, moving it away from its original 1850s state. Neither Morley and Grace's son Bill, nor daughter Iris, were involved with farming, so they were the last of the Pages to live on the farm. They sold it to the Ministry of Natural Resources in 1968, but continued to live on the farm until the summer of 1976.

The Ministry of Natural Resources currently retains ownership of the Backus Page-House. The Ministry has entered into a lease agreement with the Tyrconnell Heritage Society. The society was incorporated in 1994 with the express purpose of restoring the house and property to its 1850s condition. In 1998 the society undertook a restoration of the property, renamed the house in tribute to both its longtime owners and undertook a mandate of preservation and historical education regarding the estate and the Talbot Settlement in general.

== The Page family ==
In 1845, Jonas Page, with his wife and five-year-old son arrived from Oxfordshire, England at Five Stakes, Upper Canada which is now known as Talbotville. He was looking to settle in the area and was directed to the offices of Colonel Thomas Talbot. Talbot had obtained a large land grant from the British government along the shores of Lake Erie and was charged with organizing the settlement of the area.

Jonas, on completing the 14-mile (23 km) journey to Talbot's log cabin, found Talbot in a less than agreeable mood. When informed where Jonas was from, Talbot told him he wouldn't sell him any land. Not ready to give up yet, Jonas replied he would go over Talbot's head. He waited and returned several days later to try again and was awarded with a parcel of land at the princely sum of $2.00 an acre on the shores of Lake Erie, 2 miles (3.2 km) west of Port Tyrconnell.

Jonas was able to clear the land and build a log house with the help of his nearest neighbour, Job Curtis. This was an extremely important as Talbot had been known to repossess the land of settlers who did not clear and settler the land within an acceptable time period. With a home built he was able to return to Five Stakes (Talbotville) and move his family by oxen and sled the 20 miles (32 km) through the bush to their new home.

The settler's life was a hard one. Still, individuals would take time to work towards building a strong community. One of the first projects that Jonas was able to assist with was the erection of the First Methodist Church in Tyrconnell in 1855. Jonas was of a musical bent and when the church was finished he would lead the singing of the congregation, keeping them in pitch with his own tuning fork.

Jonas and his wife had 11 children, six of whom grew to maturity.

== The Tyrconnell Heritage Society ==
The Tyrconnell Heritage Society is a local independent society established to restore and preserve the Backus-Page House and the surrounding grounds situated in the heart of the Talbot Settlement. The society also works to compile and revel the rich historical traditional of the Talbot Settlement. The society was founded in 1993 when the future of the Backus-Page property became uncertain due to MNR policies. Incorporated under the umbrella of the Ontario Historical Society in 1994, the volunteer membership of the Tyrconnell Heritage Society has since worked tirelessly to further the society's mandate.

In 1998 the society entered into a 50-year lease agreement with the Ministry of Natural Resources. This agreement, along with local financing and funding generously providing by the Ontario Trillium Foundation, allowed the society to move forward with the restoration of the 1850s Georgian style house. In addition to restoring house the society enlarged the grounds around the house, established a picnic area and erected a separate resource and multiuse facility behind the house. The Tyrconnell Heritage Society created three walking trails within the John E. Pearce Park, in which the Backus-Page House is located.

Today the society continues to move towards its goal of establishing the Backus-Page House as a living history museum. Every year the special event education program allows hundreds of children to experience the life of a Canadian pioneer family. As the museum collection grows the society has had the opportunity to increase the museum's exhibit calendar. The society and estate grounds continue to play host to a diverse number of celebrations ranging from wedding receptions to corporate day retreats.

As a part of its agreement with the Ministry of Natural Resources, the Tyrconnell Heritage Society continues to work to maintain the trails and facilities of the John E. Pearce Provincial Park. Society members provide guided hikes and support the work of educational and research institutions that conduct studies in the area. A membership agenda has been established to record the seasonal characteristics within the park boundaries.

Efforts are underway to expand education programs to a year-round format as well as increase museum programming and activities. The renovation of the estate will take a giant step forward as the rectory barn is set to receive a welcome restoration. The Tyrconnell Heritage Society is dedicated to ensuring that the Backus-Page House Museum continues to enjoy its prominent position as one of the few remaining historical landmarks along the northern shore of Lake Erie.
