= North Lanark Regional Museum =

Museum in Ontario, Canada

Coordinates: 45°11′14″N 76°07′05″W

The North Lanark Regional Museum is a museum in Ontario, Canada that was started and managed by the North Lanark Historical Society to collect, preserve, and display the history of Mississippi Mills. It is a member of Ontario Museum Association (OMA).

== Exhibits ==
=== Almonte's Pioneer Providers ===
This exhibit shows 4 prominent doctors in Almonte's history, Dr. Metcalfe, Dr. Cannon, Dr. Dunn, Dr. Hanly, and the impact that they had on the development and growth of the community. It also displays the significant role that home medicine plays in our healthcare system, promoting communal and health wellbeing.

=== Pioneer Log Cabin ===
This cabin is only open from June until the end of August. It can be found at the back of the museum and it contains a variety of household items and pioneer tools.

== Virtual exhibits ==
North Lanark Regional Museum has a partnership with Virtual Museum of Canada to display these virtual exhibits.

=== Memories of '42 - Stories of the Almonte Train Wreck ===
This exhibit shows one of the worst accidents in the history of Canadian Railway. A troop train crashed into the Ottawa Valley Local passenger train which caused 39 deaths and over 150 injuries.

=== Mills of Appleton ===
This exhibit shows the history of the Mills of Appleton and the impact of these mills on the evolution of the community that surrounds it.
