= Serbian Heritage Museum =

Serbian Community Museum in Windsor, Canada

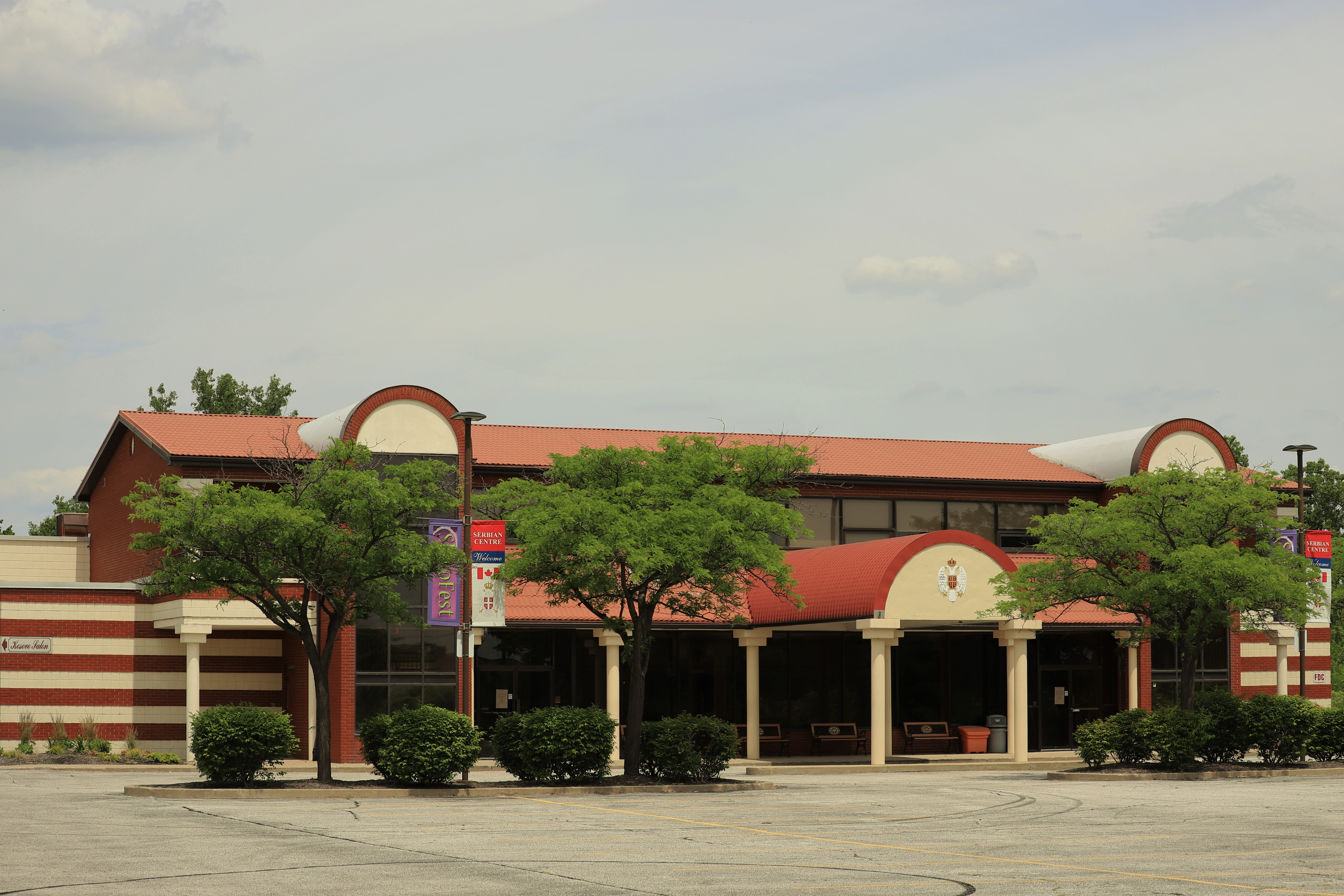
- The Serbian Centre
- Former names: Serbian Heritage Women’s Club; Serbian Heritage Women’s Society
- Established: 1976: Traveling exhibit 1987: Permanent location
- Location: 6770 Tecumseh Road East; Windsor, Ontario, N8T 1E6; Canada
- Coordinates: 42.3168097°N 82.9489947°W
- Collection size: 10,000
- Founder: Stanislava Markovich
- Website: serbianheritagemuseum.com

The Serbian Heritage Museum is not-for-profit community museum in Windsor, Ontario, Canada, located inside the Serbian Center. It is the largest Serbian museum located outside of Serbia. Exhibits in the museum are bilingual (Serbian and English).

== Background ==
The museum's collection consists of a variety of Serbian artifacts including art, archival documents, jewellery, textiles, instruments, books, and more. The collection was started in 1976 when the Serbian Heritage Women's Club held an exhibit at what is now Windsor's Community Museum, leading to the establishment of their own museum.

The museum holds multiple exhibits each year, some of which have gained publicity in Serbia. They sometimes send out travelling exhibits to other locations in Ontario. The museum also participates in cultural events in conjunction with the Serbian Center, such as festivals or dance performances.
