= Canada South Science City =

Science museum in Windsor, Ontario, Canada

- Amaze Yourself!

- Location of the museum in Ontario
- Established: 2004
- Location: 749 Felix Avenue; Windsor, Ontario; N9C 3K9
- Coordinates: 42°18′57″N 83°01′07″W
- Type: Science centre
- President: William E. Baylis
- Website: www.cssciencecity.com

Canada South Science City is an interactive science centre/museum in Windsor, Ontario, Canada. In 2021 the organization posted a notice on their website that they've closed the centre to the public as a result of vandalism, with hopes to reopen in the future.

Canada South Science City is located in the former J.L. Forster Secondary School (renamed the Forster Community Hub) at 749 Felix Avenue in one of Windsor's most historic communities, Sandwich Town, on the city's west end.

Inside the main building includes:

- Biodiversity Exhibit
- Fossil Dig Site for children
- Lagoon section with live reptiles
- Exploratorium which includes many interactive physics and other exhibits
- Science Cafe for lunches and discussion panels
- Summer Camp room
- Computer Lab

Initially funded by a grant from the City of Windsor, Science City is now overseen by a volunteer board of directors. It is a completely community run non-profit facility.
