= Richmond Hill Heritage Centre =

Coordinates: 43.87682°N 79.43676°W

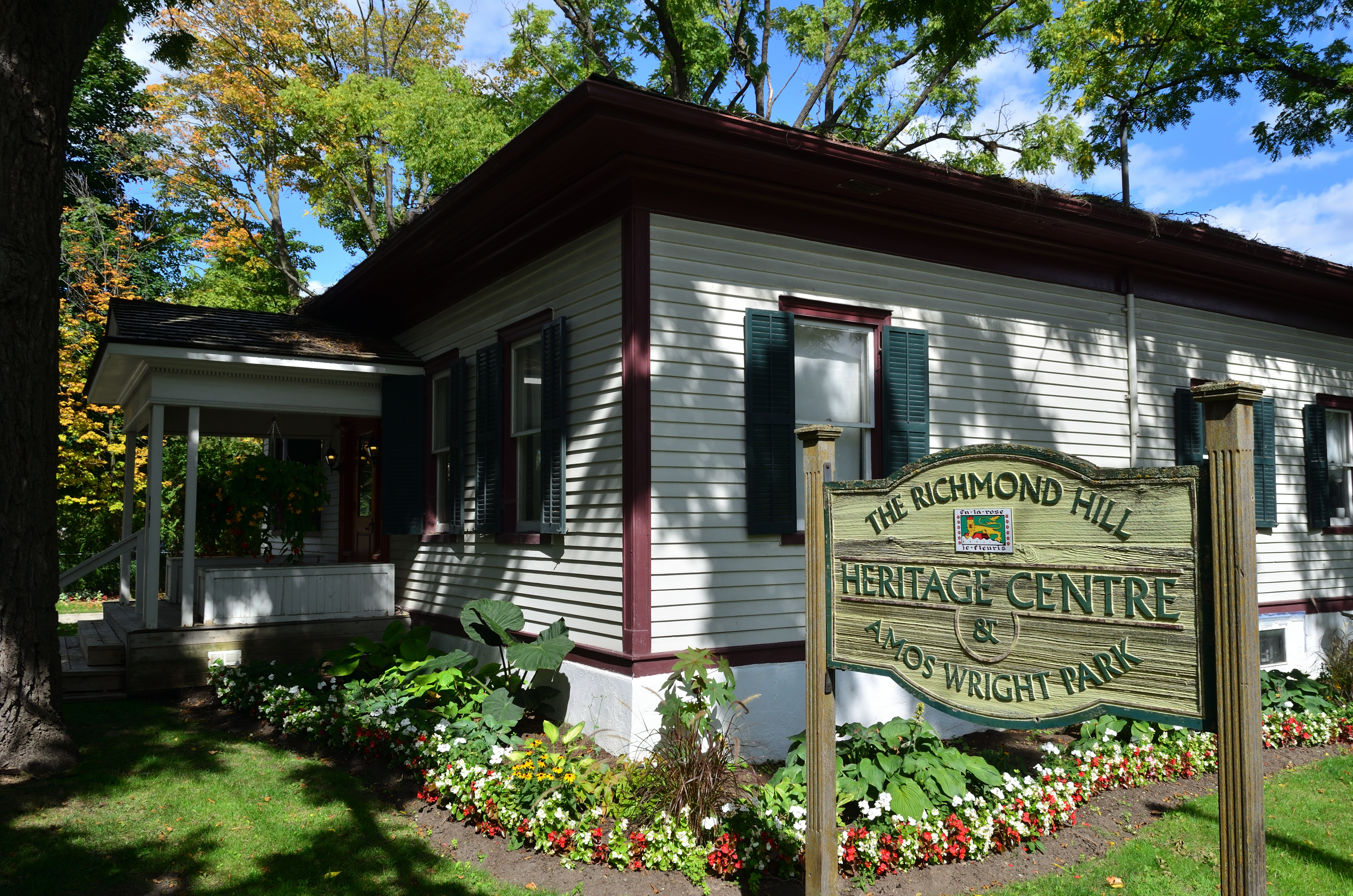
- Established: 1997
- Location: 19 Church St. North, Richmond Hill, Ontario, Canada
- Type: Municipal Heritage Centre
- Website: Richmond Hill Heritage Centre

Richmond Hill Heritage Centre is an 1840s Regency-style dwelling in Richmond Hill, Ontario, Canada, and is a noteworthy example of its style.

== Location and former ownership ==
Built circa 1840, well prior to Richmond Hill's incorporation in 1873, this Regency-style dwelling at 19 Church Street North has been designated as a Cultural Heritage Resource by the Town of Richmond Hill.

The facility opened in 1997. Formerly the house of prominent local leader and Parliamentarian Amos Wright, 1809-1886, it adjoins a park also named for Wright. One of the signature flowers in this garden is the rose, especially since roses form part of the town emblem and since rose growing was once an important industry in Richmond Hill.

== Mission statement ==
Aims included in the Heritage Centre's Mission Statement are to "contribute to the understanding of the cultural heritage of Richmond Hill by collecting, documenting and preserving resources as represented by the past, present and future". The Centre is regularly used for a wide variety of local activities.

== Affiliations ==
The Museum is affiliated with: CMA, CHIN, and Virtual Museum of Canada.
