= St. Catharines Museum =

Museum in St. Catharines, Ontario, Canada

St. Catharines Museum and Welland Canals Centre
- Established: 1967; 59 years ago
- Location: 1932 Welland Canals Parkway Lock; St. Catharines, Ontario; L2P 0A2
- Coordinates: 43.155383°N 79.194335°W
- Director: Kathleen Powell
- Owner: City of St. Catharines
- Website: www.stcatharines.ca/arts-culture-and-events/st-catharines-museum-and-welland-canals-centre/

The St. Catharines Museum and Welland Canals Centre is a museum in Ontario, Canada dedicated to the history of St. Catharines and the history of the Welland Canal. It is located along Lock 3 of the Welland Canal.

== History ==
The St. Catharines Museum was established in 1967 in the old Merritton Town Hall. The original build was built in 1879 and housed the government of Merritton until 1961. The first budget of the museum was $10 000 CAD.

By 1984, the St. Catharines Historical Museum was in deep disrepair and it was struggling to preserve its artefacts. At the time, the St. Catharines city council refused to fund a renovation or a relocation of the museum. Initially, the museum was proposed to be moved to the waterworks building at 125 Welland Ave. in St. Catharines, however this plan was abandoned in 1987 in favour of Lock 3 which was already a local tourist attraction with its viewing platform for the canal. The current building was opened to the public in 1991.

In 1997, the Ontario Lacrosse Association in conjuncture with Lacrosse Canada and the government of Ontario established the Ontario Lacrosse Hall of Fame and Museum with the museum.

== Collections ==
The St. Catharines Museum and Welland Canals Centre is host to variety of collections and archives related to local history. In particular, it contains a vast photograph collection from the St. Catharines Standard.

Other collections include:

- Ontario Lacrosse Hall of Fame and Museum
- The Underground Railroad and African Canadian heritage collections
- Welland Canal collection
