= List of surviving Supermarine Spitfires =

Currently listed numbers of surviving Spitfires
Condition	Number
Airworthy	78
Static display	64
Restoration / stored	66
Total	208

A Supermarine Spitfire landing at London Biggin Hill Airport in June 2024.

The Supermarine Spitfire is a British single-seat fighter aircraft formerly used by the Royal Air Force along with many other Allied countries throughout the Second World War and afterwards into the 1950s as both a front-line fighter and also in secondary roles.

Many smaller countries purchased Spitfires as the major industrial nations phased out propeller-powered aircraft in favour of new jets. When these smaller nations started to update their air forces, many of their Second World War aircraft were sold on the open market to individuals or for scrap.

Museums and private collectors began to acquire these Spitfire and Seafire aircraft, and today many survive in these collections around the world.

This article lists surviving Spitfires and Seafires, according to their geographical location and their condition.

== Surviving aircraft ==
=== Australia ===
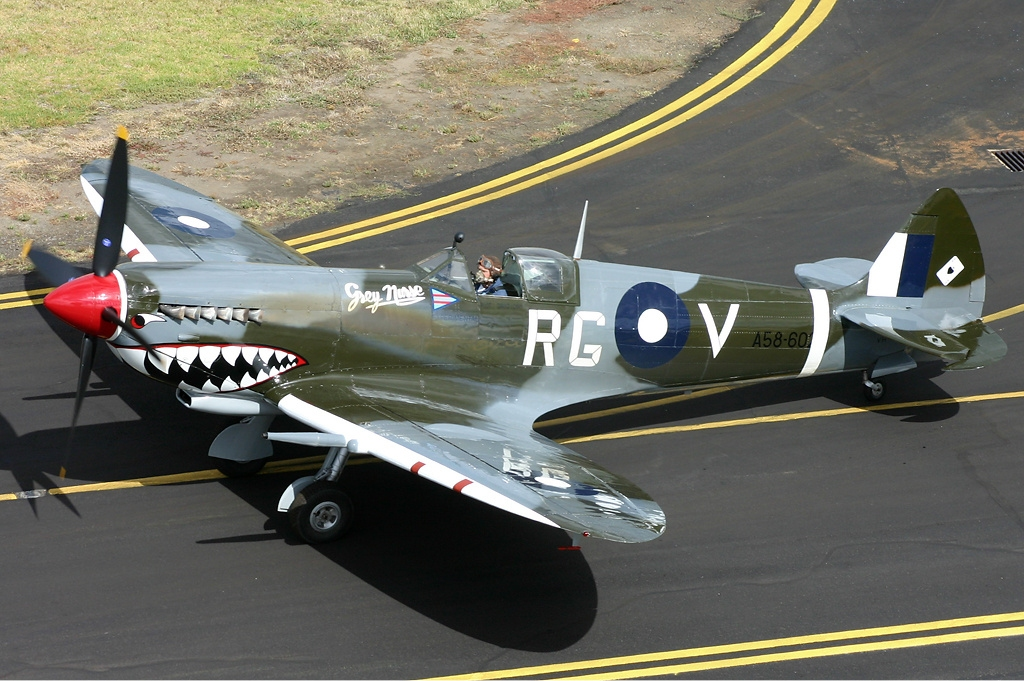
MV239 at Point Cook, Victoria (2008)

Airworthy

- Spitfire Mk.VIIIc MV154 (VH-A58). It is based at Archerfield in Brisbane, Queensland. Painted in the colors of A58-484, the personal mount of Australia's highest scoring pilot Clive Caldwell. Built at Supermarine Southampton in 1944, it was delivered by famous ATA pilot Mary Wilkens to 6 Maintenance Unit before it was shipped to Australia for the RAAF as A58-671. It never saw service and remained in storage until 1994, when it was rebuilt to fly with the UK civil register G-BKMI and wears the markings of Spitfire Mk.VIII MT928, a Spitfire which served with No. 154 Squadron. It was later sold to Meier Motors in Germany and subsequently re-registered as D-FEUR. The aircraft suffered a prop strike in 2019 during the Battle of Britain Airshow at Duxford in September. The aircraft was repaired by the Aircraft Restoration Company (ARCo), re-registered as G-BKMI and was flown in the UK. in early 2024 it was sold to Archerfield, making her return to Australia on October 18, 2024.
- Spitfire HF Mk.VIIIc MV239 (VH-HET) at Temora Aviation Museum in Temora, New South Wales. Flew with the RAAF as A58-758, it now wears the markings of the mount of Robert 'Bobby' Gibbes DSO DFC as A58-602, RG-V (RAF serial MV133). Gibbes was Wing Commander 80 Wing RAAF, Morotai, 1945. Ownership was transferred to the RAAF in July 2019 and it is operated by the Air Force Heritage Squadron (Temora Historic Flight).
- Spitfire F Mk.IX MH603 (VH-IXF). Owned by Ross Pay (son of Col Pay) and registered to Pay's Air Service Pty Ltd. Ex. South African Air Force machine MH603 was sold as scrap in 1955 and restored to airworthy condition at Scone, NSW. Completed in 331 (Norwegian) Squadron colours as based at North Weald (UK) in early 1944. MH603 took to the air on 11 December 2021 out of Scone for the first time after the restoration.
- Spitfire LF Mk.IXe PL344 (VH-IUK). Served with 602 Squadron, 442 Squadron and 401 Squadron during the war then 130 Squadron and finally No. 129 Squadron RAF before suffering a wheels-up landing in 1946. Rebuilt to airworthy condition in 1991 with the registration G-CCIX. Kermit Weeks acquired the Spitfire in 1992 and was rebuilt again to near-original condition. Completed in 2000 and registered as N644TB as a birthday gift for Tom Blair from his wife, Alice Blair, who bought it from Kermit Weeks. Airworthy until it was exported to the UK in 2007. Rebuilt for a third time including the fitting of fuel tanks in the wings before a post-rebuild first flight in 2007. Returned to America some time after, UK registration was cancelled in September 2020 and the aircraft was exported to Australia in 2021 and registered as VH-IUK. After some time in restoration, the aircraft was repainted in its 401 Squadron markings of YO-K and flew in Australia on 11 June 2022.
- Spitfire LF Mk.XVIe TB863 (VH-XVI). At Temora Aviation Museum in Temora, New South Wales. It wears 453 Squadron RAAF codes FU-P, which it wore in the UK during 1945. Ownership was transferred to the RAAF in July 2019 and it is operated by the Air Force Heritage Squadron (Temora Historic Flight).

Static display

- Spitfire Mk.IIa P7973. This Spitfire was flown on 24 operations by several Royal Air Force (RAF) and Royal Australian Air Force (RAAF) squadrons in 1941. Assigned to No. 452 Sqn (RAAF) (RAF Kenley and RAF Hornchurch), it was flown by a number of pilots, including Australian pilot Keith "Bluey" Truscott. In July 1945 it was shipped to Melbourne, Victoria, Australia for display. The aircraft has not been repainted since WWII and bears the markings of the RAF's Central Gunnery School (coded R-H). One of the few Spitfires still in its original paint, it has been displayed in the Australian War Memorial in Canberra since 1950.
- Spitfire F Mk.Vc/Trop BS231. Partial airframe on display at the Australian Aviation Heritage Centre, Darwin, Northern Territory. Former Australian Spitfire A58-92 was recovered in 1983 at low tide from the wartime water crash-site, Point Charles NT. Display incorporates parts from both BS178 / A58-70 & JG731 / A58-172.
- Spitfire F Mk.Vc/Trop EE853. Displayed at the South Australian Aviation Museum, Port Adelaide, South Australia. This aircraft was manufactured in 1942 by Westlands in the UK. It was shipped to Australia as A58-146 and became part of No. 79 Squadron RAAF at Milne Bay. On 28 August 1943, it crashed on Kiriwina Island and was transported back to Goodenough Island. In 1971, Langdon Badger found the aircraft and in 1973, he had it shipped to Adelaide. After four years of restoration at Parafield Airport, Langdon displayed the Spitfire at his Adelaide home. In August 2001 the aircraft was put on display in the museum.

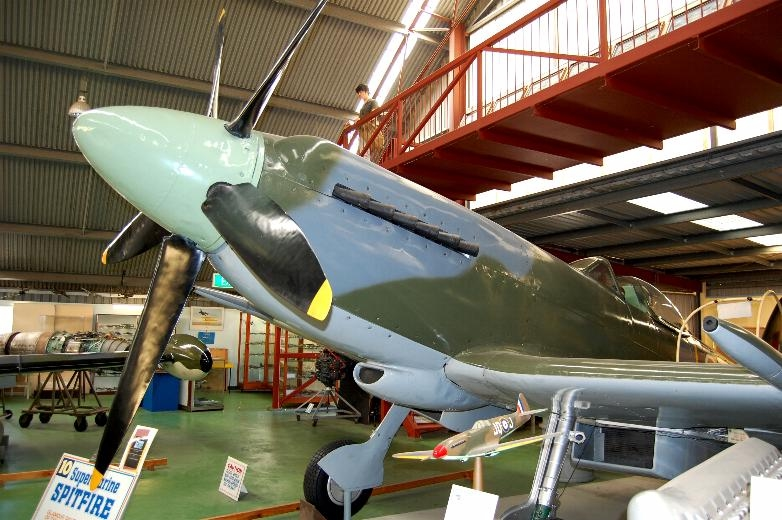
PK481 on display at Bull Creek, Western Australia.

- Spitfire F Mk.22 PK481. Displayed at the RAAF Association Aviation Heritage Museum, Bull Creek, Western Australia. The aircraft was acquired from the Brighton & Hove Branch of the Royal Air Force Association in the UK in 1959 and was initially displayed outside on a pole before being brought into the museum and refurbished in 1977.

Restoration or stored

- Spitfire F Mk. Ia X4009 (G-EMET). Under restoration to fly by Hunter Fighter Collection Incorporated. It was built in 1940 and was sent to No. 234 Squadron RAF on 18 August 1940 as AZ-Q. It was flown by Paterson Clarence Hughes, who was credited with 9 kills and 1 probable in X4009. He was killed in this aircraft while attacking a Dornier Do 17 and unsuccessfully bailing out on 7 September 1940. The remains were recovered years after and was later on registered G-EMET. Ross & Ann-Maree Pay acquired the wreckage in 2021 and donated X4009 to Hunter Fighter Collection Incorporated, an Australian registered charity. The aircraft is being restored to airworthiness by Vintage Fighter Restorations at Scone, NSW Australia.
- Spitfire F Mk.Vc/Trop BR545. Owned by the Royal Australian Air Force Museum and in storage at Point Cook, Victoria. Served with the RAAF as A58-51. Former No. 54 Squadron RAF machine, marked DL-E. Force landed on mudflats at low tide, Prince Regent River, near Truscott WA 22 December 1943. The wreck was recovered by the RAAF Museum in November 1987. The Merlin engine and sections of the airframe were recovered.
- Spitfire F Mk.Vc/Trop BS164 (VH-CIP). Under restoration by Vintage Fighter Restorations. Delivered to the RAAF as A58-63 with No. 54 Squadron RAF in Australia in 1942 as DL-K before being wrecked in a collision with Spitfire LZ845/A58-214 in 1944 while in service with No. 452 Squadron RAAF. The wreckage was recovered in 1975 and later acquired by Peter Croser and Michael Aitchison in 1982 before Michael G. Aitchison solely acquired it in 2008, who had it registered as VH-CIP. Ross Pay of Vintage Fighter Restorations acquired the wreckage in 2019, and is restoring it to airworthy condition.
- Spitfire F Mk.Vc/Trop MA353 (VH-CIQ). Under restoration by Vintage Fighter Restorations. Delivered to the RAAF as A58-232 with No. 54 Squadron RAF as DL-A before joining No. 452 Squadron RAAF as QY-Z. The aircraft disappeared in 1944 during operations which took the life of its pilot, Sergeant Colin William Dunning. The aircraft was found in 1946, which was when the pilot's remains were recovered from the wreck and buried. The aircraft was recovered in 1969, with the fuselage going to John Haslett while the Merlin engine and wings were put on display at the Darwin Air Museum. The wreckage eventually came together in the hands of Peter Croser and Michael Aitchison from Melbourne in 1982 before becoming Michael Aitchison's sole ownership in 2006, being registered as VH-CIQ. Vintage Fighter Restorations later acquired the wreck in 2019.
- Spitfire LF Mk.IXb MJ789. Owned by the Royal Australian Air Force Museum and in storage at Point Cook, Victoria. Ex-453 (RAAF) Squadron, it wore the markings MJ789 / FU-B. Crashed in River Orne, near Caen, France, on 11 June 1944 as a result of anti-aircraft fire, claiming the life of pilot Flight Lieutenant Henry 'Lacy' Smith. Both F/L Smith and MJ789 were recovered from the riverbed in November 2010. Subsequently, F/L Smith was buried with full military honours in Normandy and the wreckage of MJ789 was transferred to the RAAF Museum and transported to Australia for conservation with a view to eventual display.
- Spitfire LF Mk.IXe SL633. Owned by John Sessions with the Historic Flight Foundation and based at Felts Field, Spokane Washington. A historic machine that has served with the Royal Air Force, the Czechoslovak Air Force, the fledgling Israeli Air Force, and finally the Burmese Air Force. It wears its markings of the Czechoslovak Air Force as JT-10 of the 4th Air Regiment. The Spitfire suffered a landing accident on 7 July 2023, sustaining damage to the propeller, gear and underside of the aircraft. This would see the aircraft sold to Australia to have its rebuild take place for a new owner.
- Seafire F Mk.XV SW800 (VH-CIH). In storage, Adelaide area, South Australia. Recovered from Brownhills scrapyard in the UK circa 1991, and shipped to Melbourne VIC.

=== Belgium ===
Airworthy

- Spitfire LF Mk.XVIe SL721 (OO-XVI). Owned by Vintage Fighter Aircraft. Refinished in the markings of AU-J from No. 421 Squadron RCAF and was part of the Gatineau, Quebec based Vintage Wings of Canada's collection, registered as C-GVZB. It was sold to Vintage Fighter Aircraft in Belgium in airworthy condition and is registered as OO-XVI.

Static display

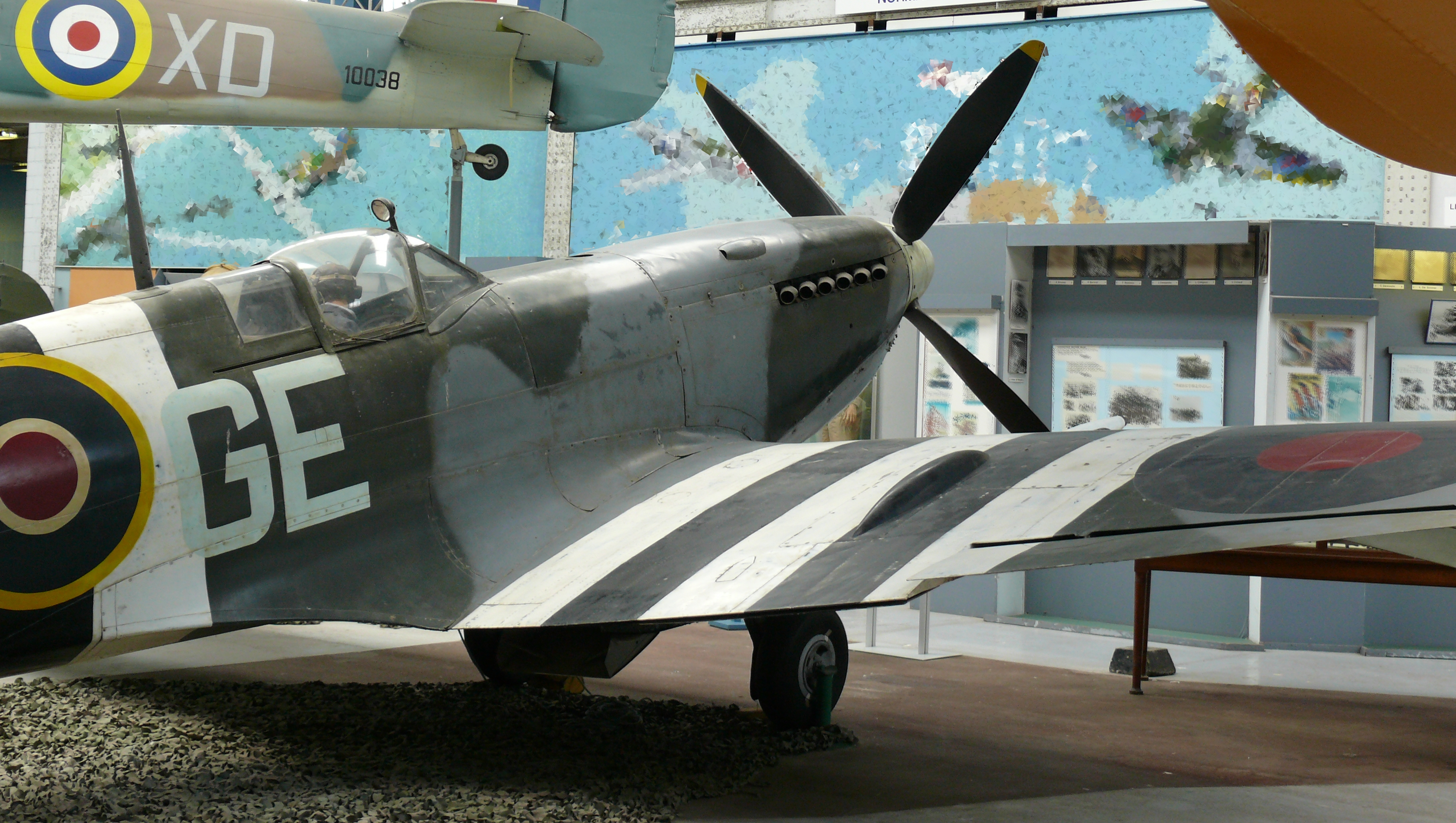
MJ783/SM15 in Brussels

- Spitfire LF Mk.IXe MJ783. Served with the Belgian Air Force as SM-15. Painted as MJ360 / GE-B from 349 (Belgian) Squadron, Royal Air Force, on display at the Royal Museum of the Armed Forces and Military History in Brussels .
- Spitfire FR Mk.XIVc MV246. on display at the Royal Museum of the Armed Forces and Military History in Brussels. Delivered to the Belgian Air Force with the Belgian tail number SG-55. Restored in 1951 with parts from other written-off Belgian Spitfires and displayed with the squadron codes GE-R.
- Spitfire FR Mk.XIVc RM921. on display at the Musee Spitfire in Florennes. Delivered to the Belgian Air Force with the tail number SG-57 in August 1948. Written off in a taxiing accident after a partial landing gear collapse in November 1951. Used as a gatekeeper at the Florennes Air Base, mounted on a pole. Restored to static display between 1987 & 1992, displayed as TX995 / RL-D, the personal plane of Raymond Lallemant, though the original TX995 had a bubble canopy.

=== Brazil ===
Static Display

- Spitfire HF Mk.IXe MA793. On static display at the Museu Aeroespacial Paulista (MAPA). MA793 served with the USAAF (believed to be the only surviving Spitfire to have done so) in 1943 before joining the SAAF with serial 5601 in 1948. It became part of a playground in 1954 at a children's hospital in Pretoria until 1967. The aircraft was rebuilt in the markings of PT672, another SAAF Spitfire. The aircraft was regularly flown at airshows around South Africa until it was sold to a purchaser in California in 1986 with the register N930BL, and repainted as EN398, codes JE-J, one of Johnnie Johnson's Spitfires. In 1999, it became the property of Rolls-Royce who sold it to the TAM/Wings of Dreams at São Carlos International Airport in Brazil for public display. The museum closed in 2016 with plans announced in 2018 to have a new location for the museum at São José dos Campos Airport, near the Embraer plant. In 2026, to be displayed once again, the aircraft was loaned to the MAPA at the Campo de Marte Airport, São Paulo.

=== Canada ===
Airworthy

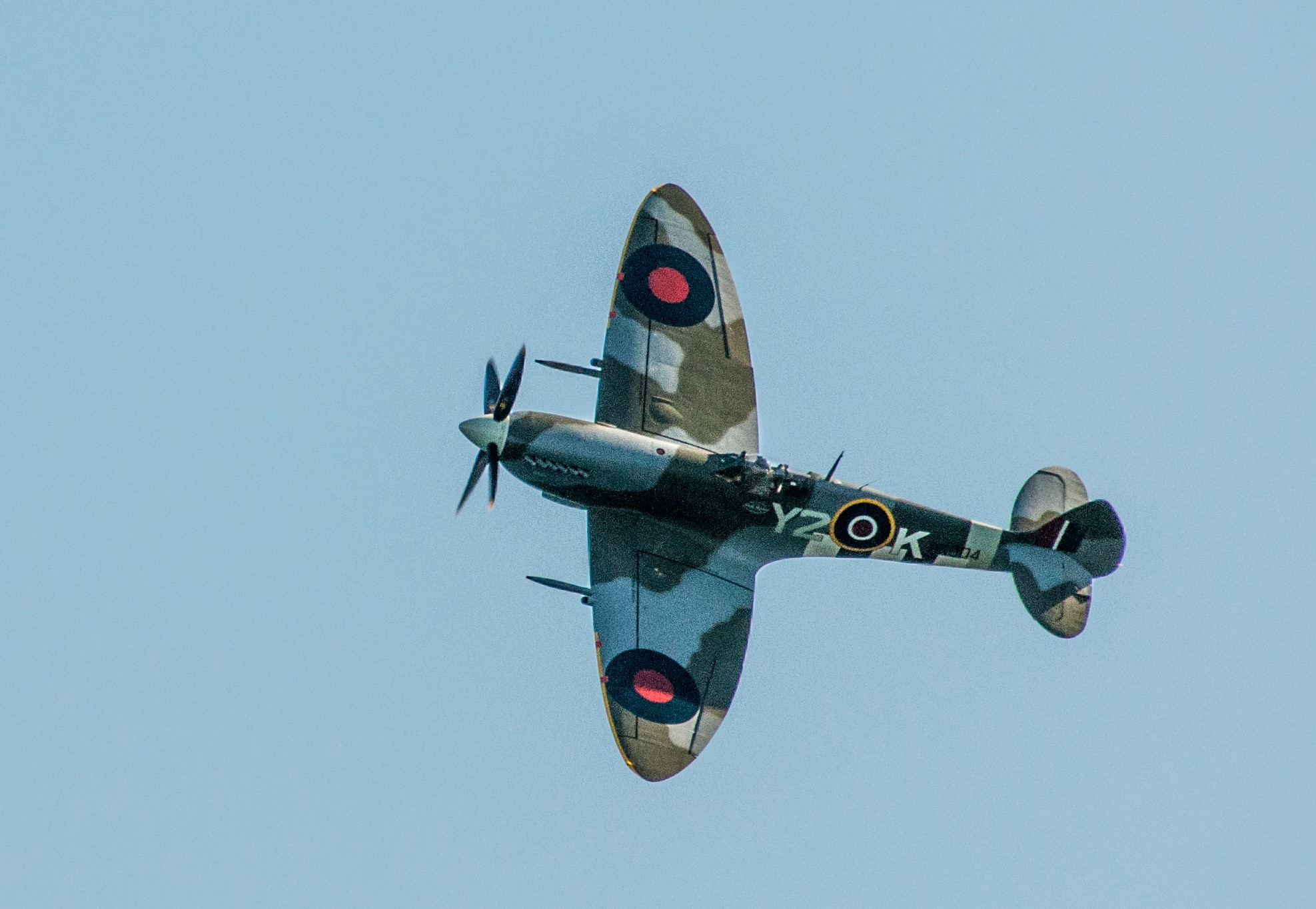
Restored Spitfire CGYQQ Y2K S/N TE294

- Spitfire HF Mk.IXe TE294 (C-GYQQ). Previously under restoration to flying condition at Comox, British Columbia, for Vintage Wings of Canada, it arrived at their main base at Gatineau, Quebec in late September 2014 for continued restoration back to airworthy condition. Finished to represent MK304, codes Y2-K. The first flight after restoration took place at Gatineau, Quebec, on 7 June 2017.
- Spitfire FR Mk.XIVe TZ138 (C-GSPT). Was built in early 1945 and served in the RAF before joining the Royal Canadian Air Force later that year for cold weather tests, even at one point fitted with skis that came off a Tiger Moth. After military retirement, it was exported and registered in the United States with various registrations and participated in many air races. By the 1970s it became a restoration project and was rebuilt to airworthy condition in the US in 1999 before being exported to Canada with the registration C-GSPT.

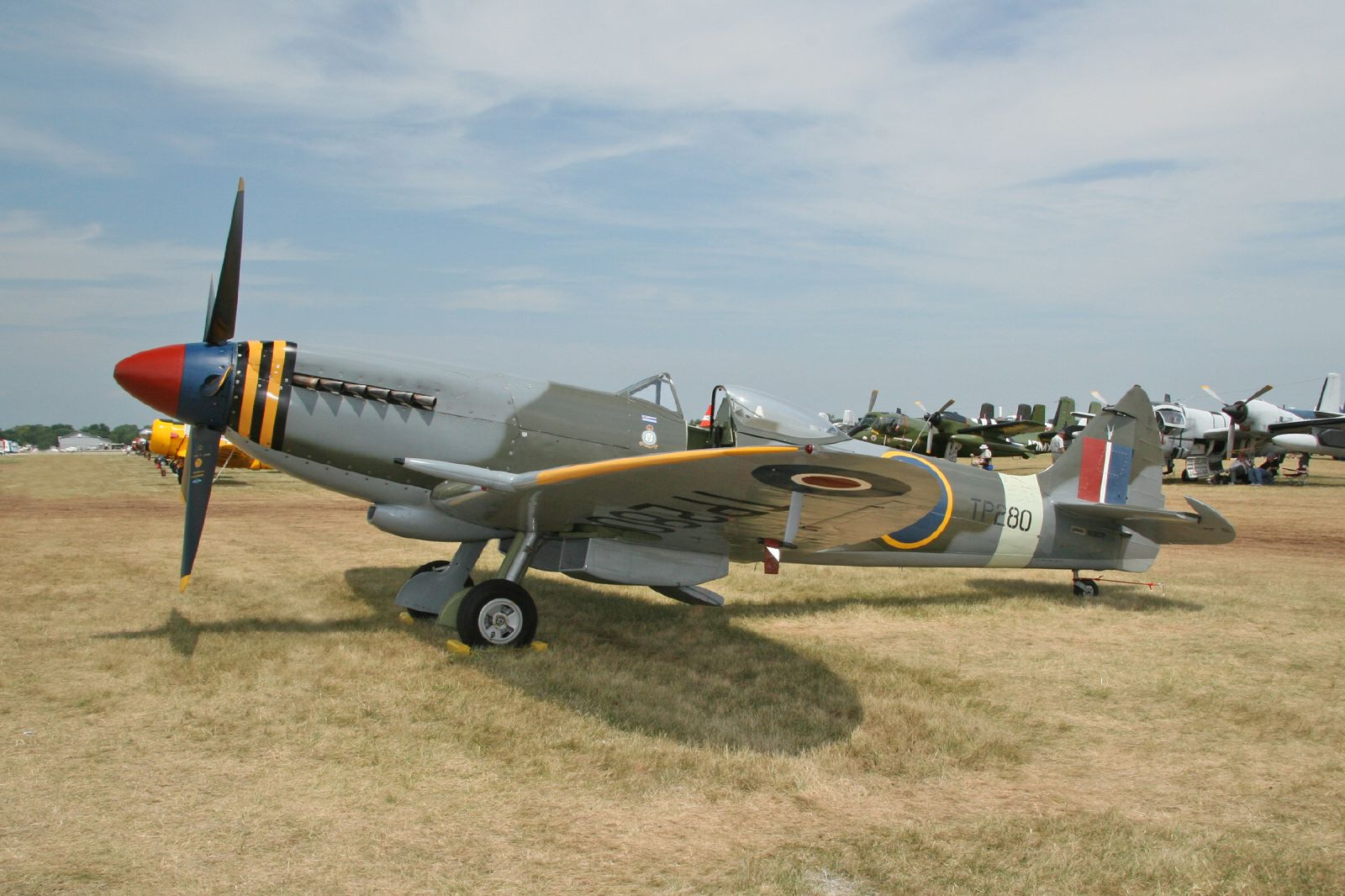
TP280 on display at Oshkosh 2006

- Spitfire FR Mk.XVIIIe TP280 (C-GANI). Airworthy with the Hangar 10 Collection. Delivered to India as HS654 in 1947 and brought back as a hulk in the 1970s. It was rebuilt to airworthy condition in 1992 with the UK registration of G-BTXE before being sent to the United States later that year as N280TP. In 2015 it was acquired by the Hangar 10 Collection in Germany as D-FSPT. TP280 moved to Canada in 2023 under the registration of C-GANI with the Stampede Aviation collection.

Static display

- Spitfire F Mk.IIb P8332. Battle of Britain veteran, on display at the Canadian War Museum, Ottawa. It wears the markings and codes P8332 / ZD-L of 222 Sqn to replicate the scheme it wore when serving with the Squadron in 1941. Presentation aircraft, "SOEBANG N.E.I.", funded by the Netherlands East Indies.

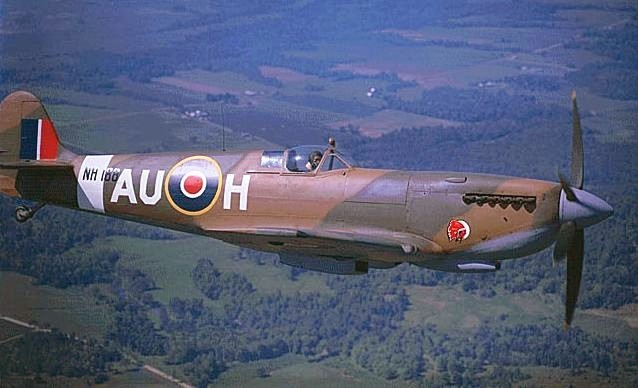
NH188

- Spitfire LF Mk.IXc NH188. Served with the Royal Netherlands Air Force as H-109 (later H-64) from 1947 to 1952 and with the Belgian Air Force as SM-39 from 1952 to 1954. Privately owned, it was flown in Belgium as OO-ARC and was later imported to Canada where it flew as CF-NUS. After being donated on 7 June 1964, it is now on display in the Canada Aviation and Space Museum in Rockcliffe, Ontario as NH188 / AU-H.
- Seafire F Mk.XV PR451. On display at The Military Museums, Alberta, Calgary. It was delivered to the Royal Canadian Navy in 1946 and was struck off charge in 1949. In the 1980s, PR451 was restored for static display at the Naval Museum Of Alberta, Alberta, Canada. Now the museum is known as The Military Museums.

Restoration or stored

- Spitfire F Mk.XIVe RM747 In storage at Vintage Wings of Canada, Gatineau, Quebec, Canada. RM747 served with No.322 (Dutch) Sqdn, No.350 (Belgian) Sqdn, No.451 (Australian) Sqdn, before serving with the Royal Thai Air Force as serial number Kh.14-5/93. During the 1980s it was part of a playground at Sawankalok, Thailand.
- Spitfire Mk.XVIe TE214. On display and in the early stage of restoration at the Canadian Warplane Heritage Museum, in Mount Hope Ontario, it was previously on loan from the Canada Aviation and Space Museum in Rockcliffe, Ontario. It was built by Vickers at Castle Bromwich, UK, in 1945 and it flew post-war with RAF No. 203 Advanced Flying School until it was damaged in an accident. The British Air Ministry presented it to the RCAF in 1960 and it was transferred to the Canadian Aeronautical Collection, now the Canada Aviation and Space Museum in 1966, and with the ownership transferred to the Canadian Warplane Heritage Museum in 2022.

=== China ===
Static display

- Spitfire LF Mk.XVIe TE330. Displayed at the China Aviation Museum, Datangshan. Acquired in 2008 from New Zealand where it underwent restoration to static display condition by the Subritzky family of North Shore and sold to China via auction.

=== Czech Republic ===
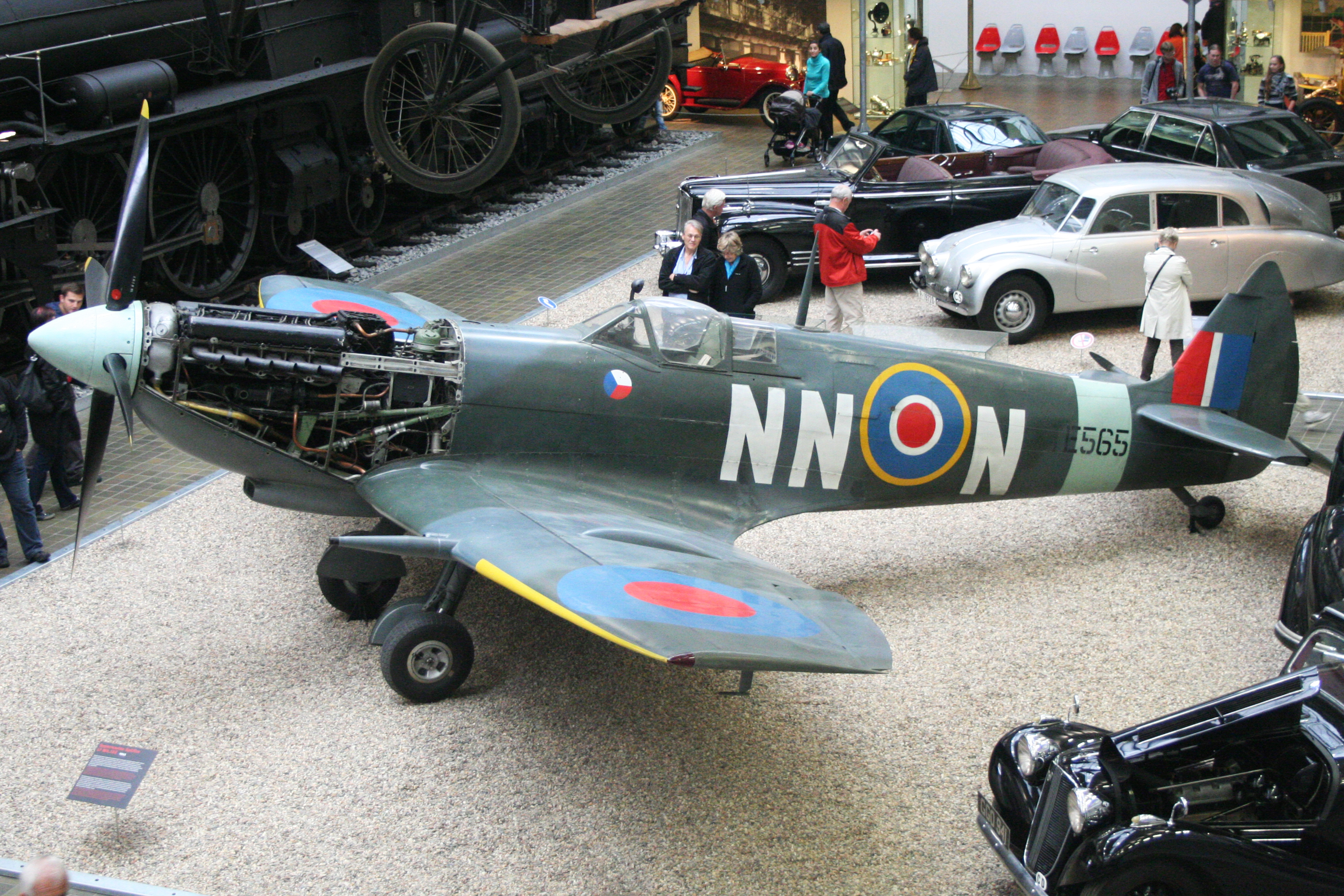
TE565 on display at the National Technical Museum

==== Airworthy ====
- Spitfire LF Mk.IXe SL633. Formerly owned by Fighter Pilot Adventure Flights in Australia, it is now based at Točná Airport in Prague as part of the airport's collection of historic aircraft. This aircraft has briefly served with the Royal Air Force, then the Czechoslovak Air Force, the fledgling Israeli Air Force, and finally the Burmese Air Force. The Spitfire suffered a landing accident on 7 July 2023, sustaining damage to the propeller, gear and underside of the aircraft. It wears its markings of the Czechoslovak Air Force as JT-10 of the 4th Air Regiment.

Static display

- Spitfire LF Mk.IXE TE565. Served with No. 310 (Czech) Squadron as A-712. Transferred to Czech Air Force in 1945 and put on display in the National Technical Museum from 1950 to 1970 when it was loaned to the Kbely Aviation Museum. In 2008 it was moved back to the National Technical Museum and put on static display as TE565 / NN-N.

=== Denmark ===
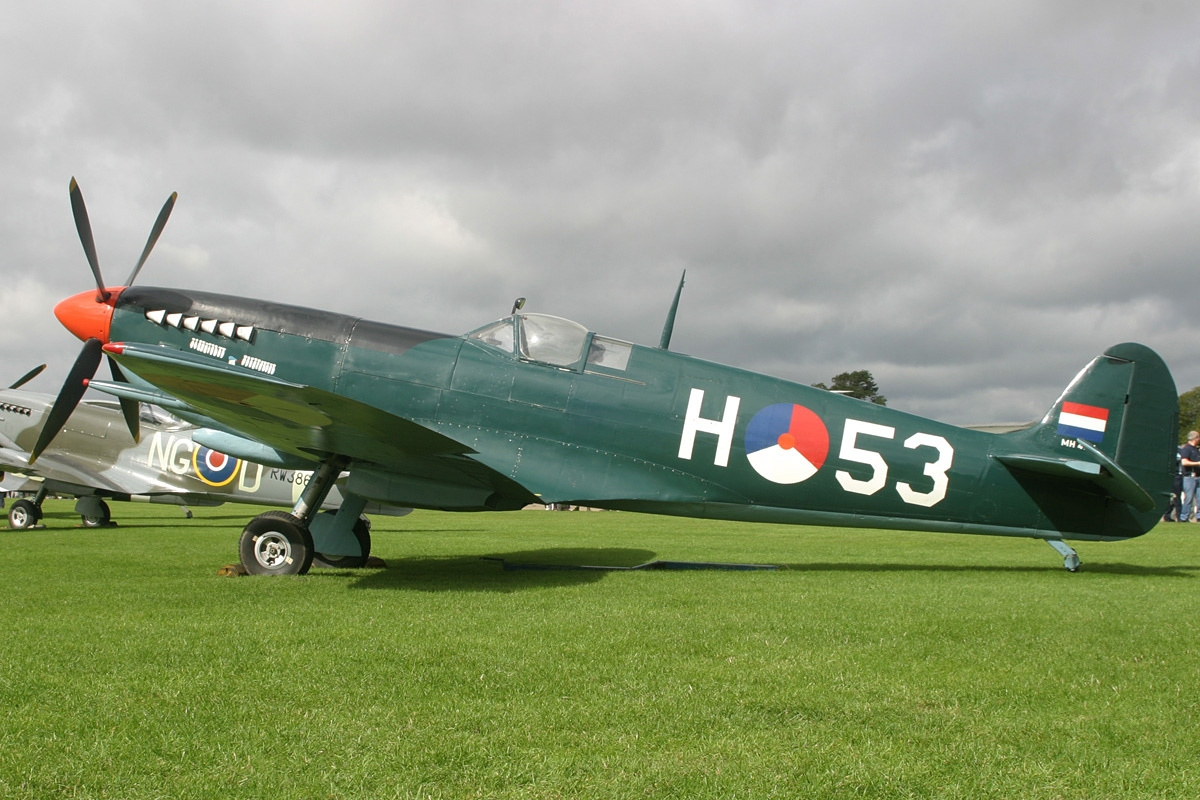
MJ271 on static display at Duxford before restoration as the "Silver Spitfire"

Airworthy

- Spitfire Mk.IX MJ271 (G-IRTY). Built in 1943 at Castle Bromwich and flew 51 combat missions. Restored as 'The Silver Spitfire' by Historic Flying Limited, the first post-restoration flight took place in late June 2019 at Duxford. Finished in polished aluminium, the then owners, Boultbee Flight Academy, circumnavigated the world in the aircraft. In 2021 it was sold to a Danish aircraft hire company.

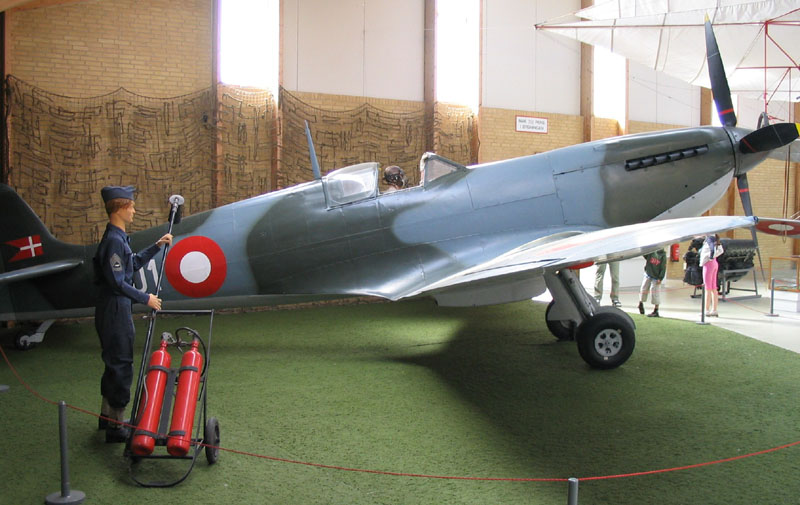
MA298 on display at the Stauning Aircraft Museum

Static display

- Spitfire HF Mk.IXe MA298. After the German occupation, the Royal Danish Air Force acquired 38 HF Mk.IXe and 3 PR Mk.XI Spitfire aircraft. The Spitfires were retired and replaced by jets between 1951 and 1955. All but two were scrapped. For a number of years, one was placed in a children's playground. MA298 is the last of the Danish Spitfires to survive; it was delivered to the Danish Air Force in 1947 and was refurbished for display at the Danmarks Flymuseumz, Stauning Airport after it was retired. The aircraft carries the markings of 41-401, which was originally carried by NH417.

=== Egypt ===
Static display

- Spitfire F Mk. Vc Trop BR491. BR491 served with 92 Squadron and crashed in 1942 in Alexandria, Egypt with the loss of its pilot, Warrant Officer Class I Lloyd George Edwards. The aircraft was recovered in 1999 by the El Alamein Military Museum and put on display in 2001 without the rear tail (presumably deteriorated away while underwater).

=== France ===
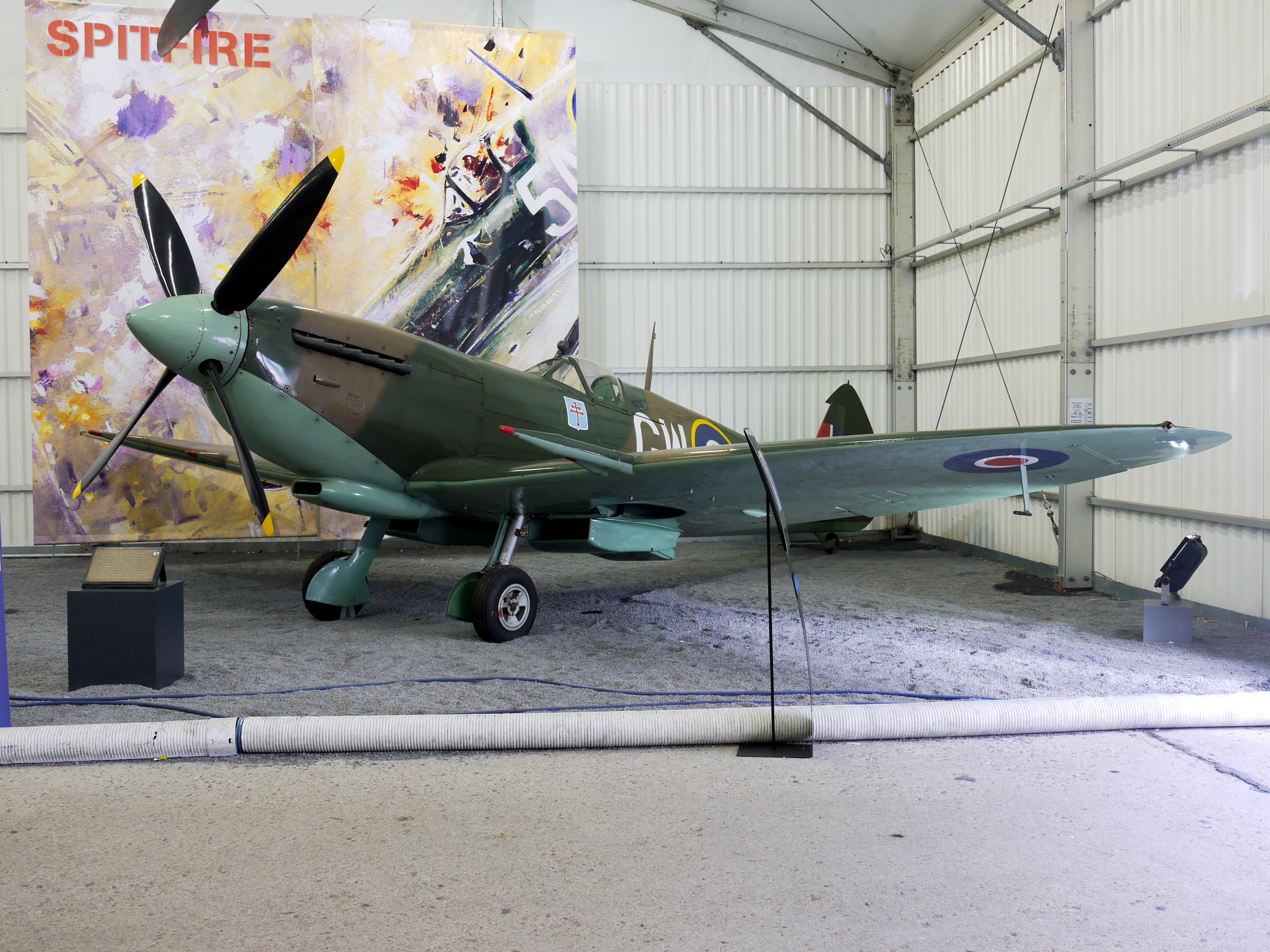
RR263 on display at Musée de l'Air et de l’espace, Le Bourget

Airworthy

- Spitfire FR Mk. XIVe RM927 (G-SXIV). Airworthy in the UK. RM927 was built in November 1944 and delivered to the RAF in January 1945, assigned to No. 430 Squadron RCAF as G9-X. After being hit by flak and put into storage for some years, it was sold to the Belgian Air Force in 1947 as SG-25, coded 3R-D, before being stripped of paint and coded IQ-W. In 1957, the aircraft was sold to a scrap dealer but put on display next to NH904 (airworthy in the US) without its wings. It passed through several owners throughout the US and UK, which saw it being delivered to Airframe Assemblies for a rebuild in 2005. The fuselage rebuild was completed in 2009 and got the registration G-JNMA. After some time in storage, the aircraft was sold to the W Air Collection in France in late 2020, with the registration changed to G-SXIV and moved to Sywell to finish the restoration. The restored Spitfire made its first flight on 5 July 2022 out of Sywell and flew to La Ferté-Alais in France a month later.
- Spitfire PR.XIX PS890 (F-AZJS). Entered service in 1945. To Royal Thai Air Force as U14-26/97, in service until 1952. Donated to Planes of Fame Air Museum in 1962. Restored to airworthy condition in 2002 as N219AM. Sold to French owner in 2005, re-registered F-AZJS. Damaged in a take-off accident at Longuyon-Villette Airfield, Meurthe-et-Moselle on 11 June 2017, the Spitfire was sent to the Aircraft Restoration Company (Historic Flying Limited) at Duxford, UK, for restoration to flight. The Spitfire was rebuilt and flew again on 6 August 2020.

Static display

- Spitfire LF Mk.XVIe RR263. Built in 1944 and delivered to the RAF that year with 2nd Tactical Air Force. The Spitfire was loaned to Vickers Supermarine for experimental reasons in 1949 before moving to storage. Used as a static backdrop for the Reach for the Sky movie and later was on a plinth at RAF Kenley as TB597, codes GW-B. Later overhauled and repainted again as TB597 as GW-B before being put on display at Musée de l’air et de l’espace, Le Bourget.

=== Germany ===
Static display

- Spitfire FR Mk.XIVe MV370. On display at the Luftfahrtmuseum, Hannover. Ex-Indian Air Force instructional airframe (marked T.44), wears the codes MV370, codes EB-Q to represent a machine from No. 41 Squadron RAF.

=== Greece ===
Airworthy

- Spitfire LF Mk.IXc MJ755 (G-CLGS). Built at the Castle Bromwich factory and delivered to No. 43 Squadron RAF in August 1944, which at the time was covering operations in Southern France. In 1947 it was transferred to the Royal Hellenic Air Force and later retired to The Hellenic Air Force Museum. In 2018, the aircraft went to the Biggin Hill Heritage Hangar in the UK to be restored to fly. The Spitfire made its first flight after restoration on 19 January 2020. Over the course of 25 to 27 May 2021, MJ755 was ferried via France and Italy back to Tatoi, Greece, where it was previously displayed.

=== India ===
Static display

- Spitfire Mk.VIII - MV459. On display at the Ambala Air Force Station.
- Spitfire F Mk.XVIIIe - SM986. Former Indian Air Force with the serial HS986. On display at the Indian Air Force Museum, Palam, New Delhi.

Restoration or stored

- Spitfire LF Mk. VIIIc NH631. On display at RIAF Museum Palam. It was delivered to the Royal Indian Air Force in 1945 and was airworthy with the Air Museum in India from the 1960s until they stopped flying it in 1989. Plans were announced in 2018 for it to be restored to flying condition by an external company.

=== Israel ===
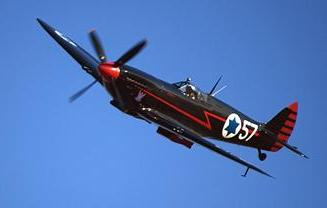
TE554, The Black Spitfire

Airworthy

- Spitfire LF Mk.IXe TE554. The Black Spitfire, and former Israeli Air Force 20-57. The personal mount of former Israeli Air Force Chief of Staff and president Ezer Weizman, it is used for ceremonial flying displays and based at the Israeli Air Force Museum in Hatzerim.

Static display

- Spitfire F Mk.IXe EN145. Built at Chattis Hill, it first flew in 1942 and was delivered to the USAAF in 1943. It was later delivered to the Italian Air Force in 1946 as MM4116 before being delivered to the Israeli Air Force as 20-78. EN145 was acquired by the IDFAF Museum in 1990 and has been on display ever since.
- Spitfire LF Mk.IXe SL653. Delivered to the Czechoslovak Air Force before being delivered to the Israeli Air Force as 20-28. It was later acquired by the IDFAF Museum in 1973 where it is on display. This Spitfire was once believed to have been TE578 (it has parts from TE578), but it was confirmed later on during restoration through parts with stencils: 425 (it was given the Burmese number UB425, but never left Israel and the number went to SL633) and the number "28" from the IDFAF 20-28 that it actually is SL653.

=== Italy ===
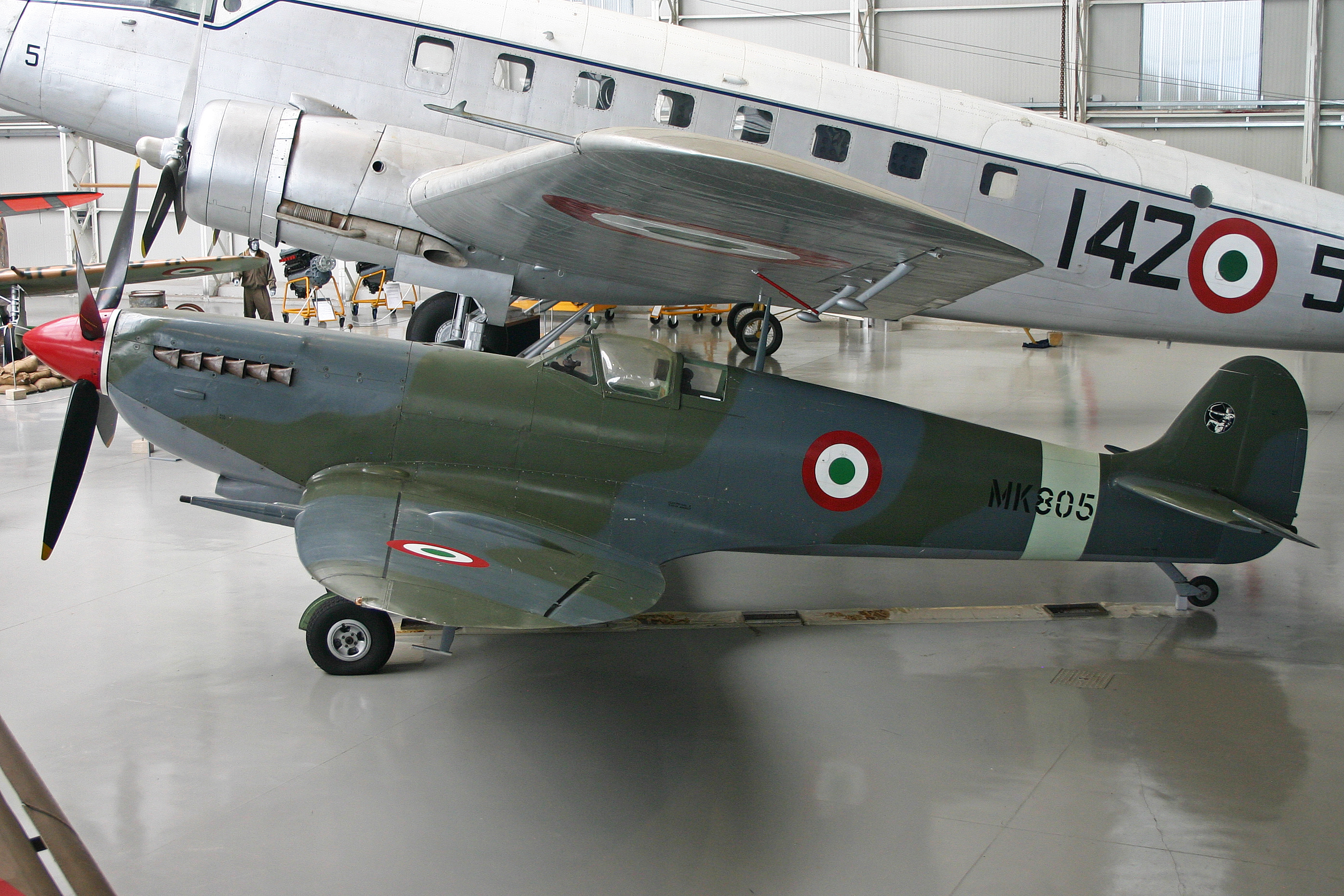
MK805, operated by the Italian Air Force in the very last stages of WWII

Static display

- Spitfire LF Mk.IXc MK805. On display at the "Vigna di Valle Museum" (Italian Air Force Museum) Bracciano, Rome, Italy.

=== Malta ===
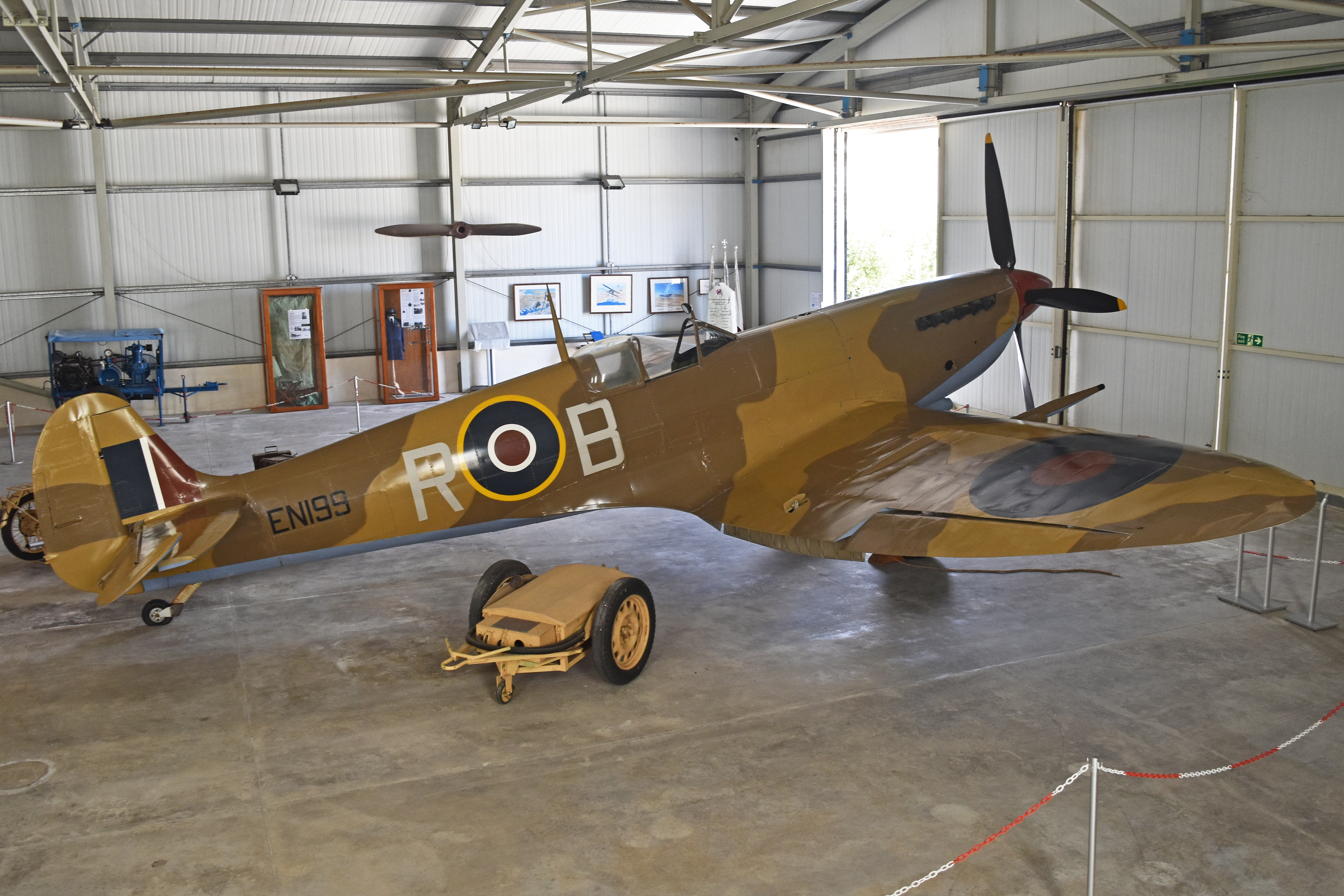
EN199 at the Malta Aviation Museum

Static display

- Spitfire F Mk.IXe EN199. On display at the Malta Aviation Museum, Ta Qali, Malta. First flown at Eastleigh on 28 November 1942. The aircraft was restored by Ray Polidano, the museum's director, in 1992. The aircraft is named 'Mary Rose' in honour of Ray Polidano's wife and carries the code R-B in memory of the highest-ranking officer who flew it - Wing Commander Ronald Berry D.F.C.

=== Myanmar ===
Static display

- Spitfire LF Mk.IXe TE513. Burmese number UB421. On external display at the newly opened (2016) Defence Services Museum which is North-East of Myanmar's capital city, Naypyidaw, in the Zeyathiri Township.
- Spitfire LF Mk.IXe TE527. Burmese number UB431. Rear fuselage and tail-section suspected to be from this aircraft on display within the newly opened Defence Services Museum on the outskirts of Naypyidaw.
- Seafire F Mk.XV PR376. Burmese number UB409. On external display at the newly opened (2016) Defence Services Museum on the outskirts of Naypyidaw.

In 2012 a great deal of media attention was given to claims by David Cundall, a British farmer and aviation enthusiast, that the RAF had buried a number of Spitfire Mk.XIV aircraft in Burma, unassembled and in their packing crates, during August 1945. No independent evidence of the burial had been uncovered and experts dismissed the story as implausible and apocryphal; military archaeologist Andy Brockman argued that for the RAF to prevent the Spitfires' misuse, it would have been far more expedient to burn them, destroy critical equipment, or crush them rather than painstakingly burying them intact. Brockman speculated that Cundall's sources may have conflated the purported RAF Spitfires with ex-Israeli Spitfires operated years later by the Burmese Air Force, as the ultimate disposition of many of these aircraft was not well documented. Despite this, the Burmese government signed an agreement with Cundall, who was leading the search, along with his Burmese business partner Htoo Htoo Zaw, allowing them to begin excavations.

Leeds University experts and an academic from Rangoon used sophisticated geophysical techniques to produce evidence consistent with buried metal at what is now Yangon International Airport, the former RAF Mingaladon airfield. In addition, other sites with buried Spitfires were claimed, one with as many as 36 aircraft interred.

In January 2013, following investigations at both Yangon International Airport and Myitkyina, archaeologists led by Brockman concluded that there were no aircraft buried at the sites. Despite this, Cundall continued his search. The following month, Cundall's sponsor Wargaming Ltd withdrew funding, saying they no longer believed any Spitfires were ever buried there and that the aircraft had been re-exported in 1946. Despite this setback, Cundall said at that time that he remained confident and the search would continue.

=== Netherlands ===
Airworthy

- Spitfire Tr.9 MJ772 (PH-KDH). Served with 341 Squadron, Royal Air Force as NL-W then with 340 Squadron as GW-A. Sold to Vickers-Armstrongs in 1950, converted to two-seat trainer. Carried Class B markings G-15-172. To Irish Air Corps in May 1951 as IAC 159. Withdrawn from flying in 1960. Sold to Film Aviation Services in November 1963 and stored at Biggin Hill. Sold to COGEA, Belgium in May 1964 and stored at Ostend Airport. Sold to Tony Samuelson in 1965 and registered G-AVAV in November 1966. Restored to airworthyness in July 1967. Leased to Spitfire Productions Ltd for use in the film Battle of Britain. A forced landing was made at Little Staughton on 9 July 1968 due to engine failure, and subsequently returned to flying condition. Later sold to Sir William Roberts and displayed as part of the Strathallan Collection, coded NL-R. Sold to Doug Champlin of Enid, Arizona, registered N8R. Later registered in Germany as D-FMKN. Suffered off-airport landing in field, near Woodchurch, Kent, United Kingdom, on 7 September 2015. Pilot uninjured. As of March 2019, airworthy owned by Warbird Experiences Ltd, based at Biggin Hill airfield. In August 2021, MJ772 was flown to its new home in The Netherlands.

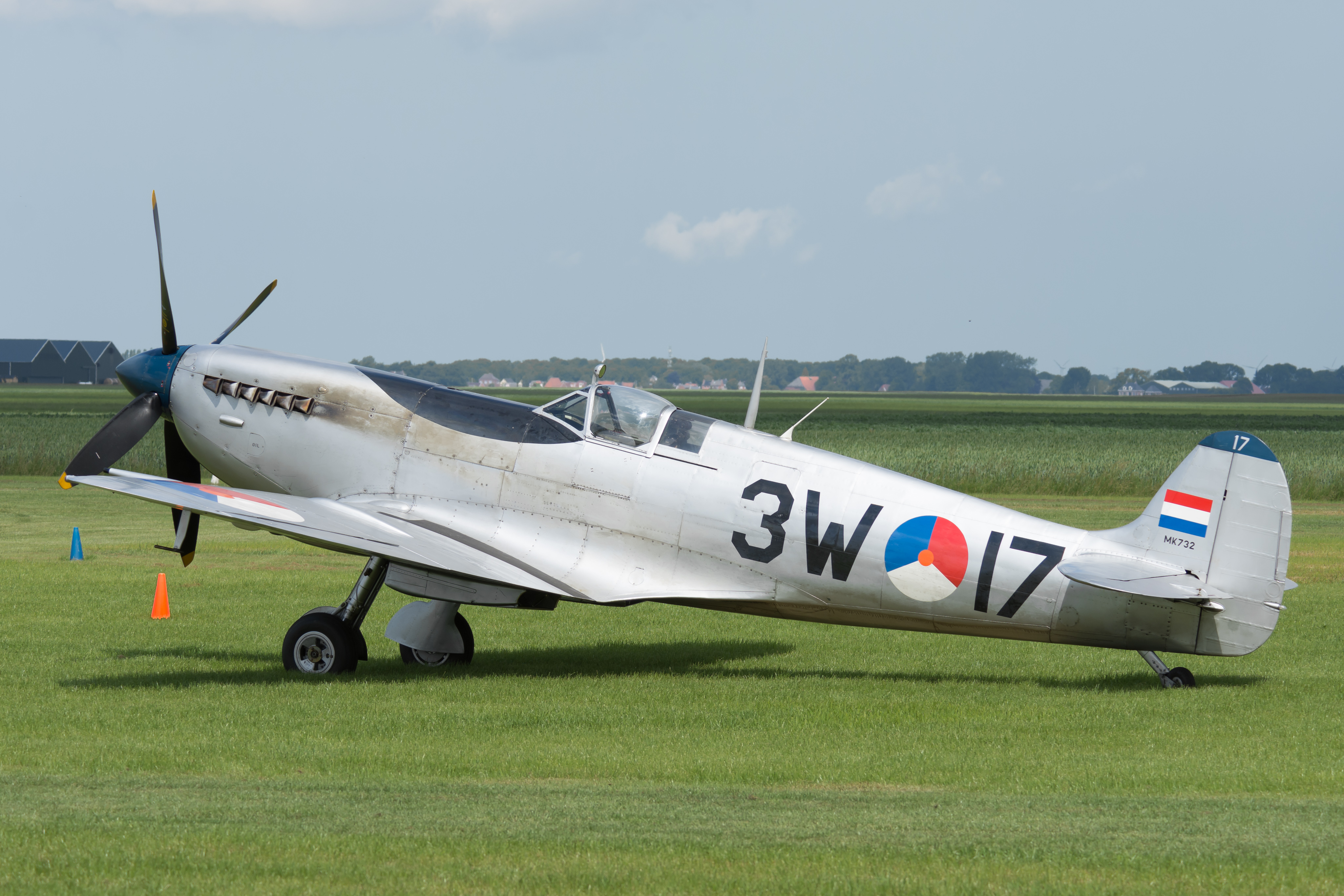
MK732 in Netherlands Air Force markings

- Spitfire LF Mk IXc MK732 (PH-OUQ). Operated by The Historic Flight of the Royal Netherlands Air Force (Koninklijke Luchtmacht Historische Vlucht) and based at Gilze-Rijen. Built in 1943, it saw action during D-Day. Following the restoration to flight, it initially carried the air force (Klu) markings H-25. Following this it was painted in the scheme it wore when serving with No. 485 Squadron RNZAF as OU-U, named 'Baby Bea V', but now wears an all-over silver scheme 3W-17 of the Royal Netherlands Air Force.
- Spitfire LF Mk.XVIe TB885 (PH-FVE). Ex 322 (Dutch) Squadron. Cut into sections and buried at RAF Kenley in 1958. Salvaged 1982. Restored to airworthy status by The Spitfire Company (Biggin Hill). Returned to the air on 4 August 2018. Now wearing original markings of 3W-V of 322Sqn, she is owned by Dutchman Frits van Eerd, CEO of Dutch supermarket chain Jumbo, who intends to base it with the RNLAF Historical Flight at Gilze-Rijen Air Base. The Spitfire is now registered in the Netherlands as PH-FVE.

Static display

- Spitfire LF Mk.IXc MJ143. On display at the newly opened National Military Museum sited on the former Royal Netherlands Air Force Base at Soesterberg. Previously in storage after being on display for many years at the now closed Militaire Luchtvaart Museum also at Soesterberg. Displayed as H-1, Royal Netherlands Air Force.

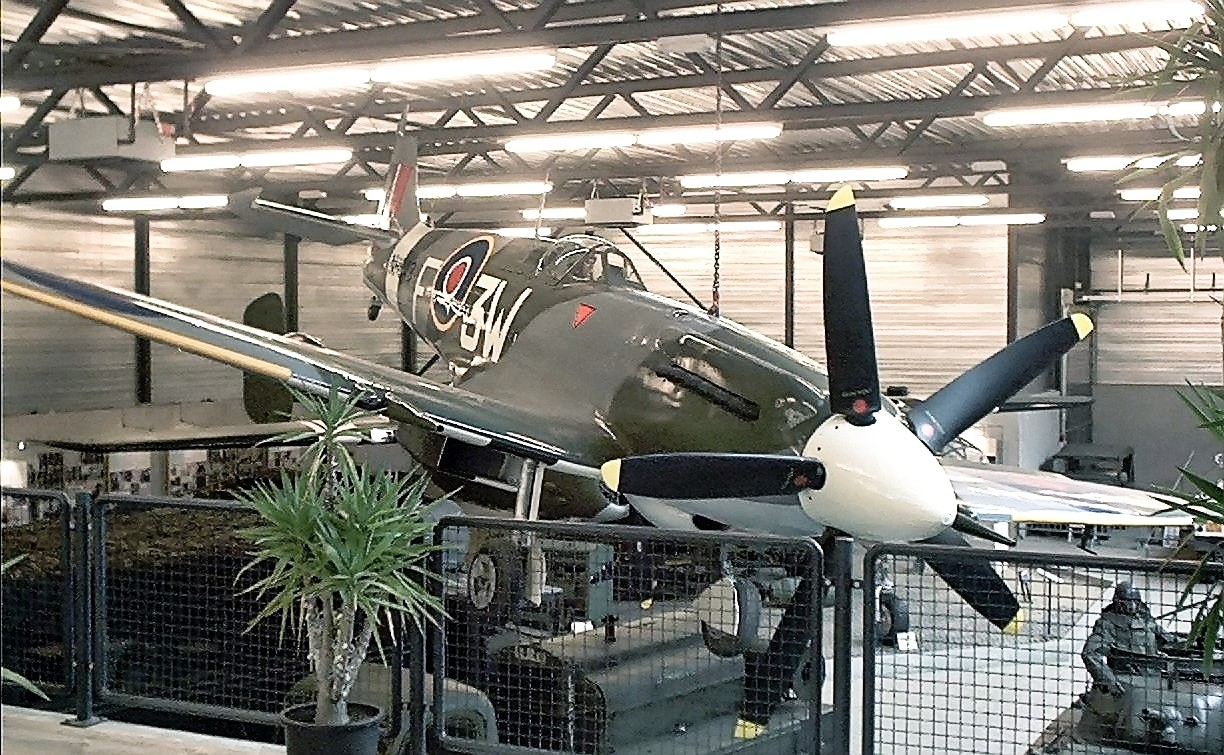
TP263 on display at Overloon

- Spitfire FR Mk.XVIIIe TP263, Displayed at the National War & Resistance Museum, Overloon. Ex-Indian Air Force HS649, rebuilt to represent a Mk.XIVc. Wears the spurious serial NH649, with the codes 3W-F of No.322 (Dutch) Squadron.

=== New Zealand ===
Airworthy

- Spitfire LF Mk.IXc PV270 (ZK-SPI). Owned by businessman Brendon Deere and restored to an airworthy condition over five years at Feilding, New Zealand, it flew again on 18 March 2009. The aircraft is based in a purpose-built hangar at RNZAF Base Ohakea along with Brendon Deere's North American Harvard.

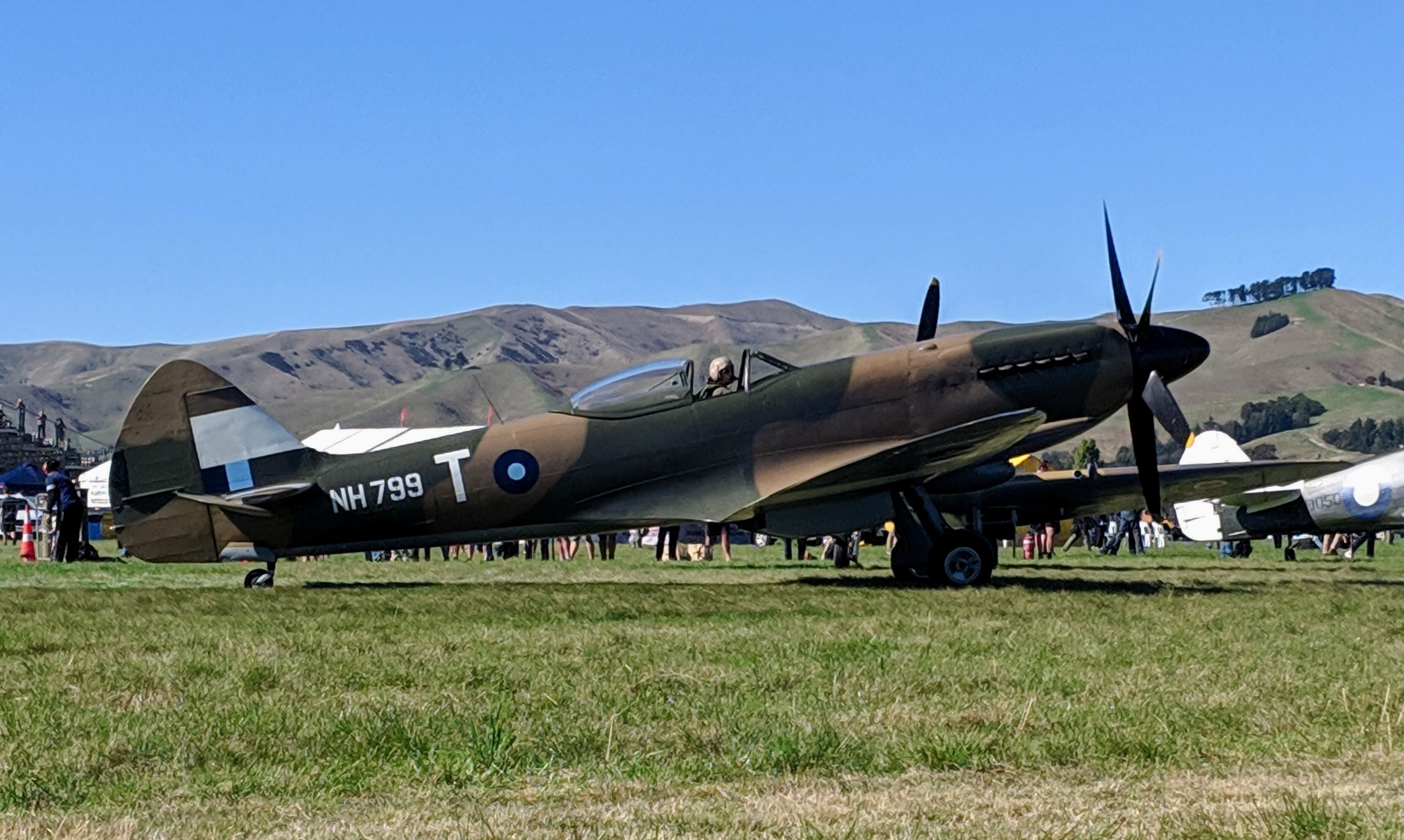
Supermarine Spitfire FR MK.XIVe taxing at the 2019 Omaka Classic Fighters Airshow, Blenheim, New Zealand

- Spitfire FR Mk.XIVe NH799 (ZK-XIV). Owned by 'The Chariots of Fire Fighter Collection' and based at Omaka airfield, New Zealand. Post restoration first flight 2 April 2015, with John Lamont at the controls. Purchased by the Chariots of Fire Fighter Collection, which is based at Omaka, in 2010. Restored to airworthy condition by Avspecs Limited at Ardmore Airport, Auckland.

Static display

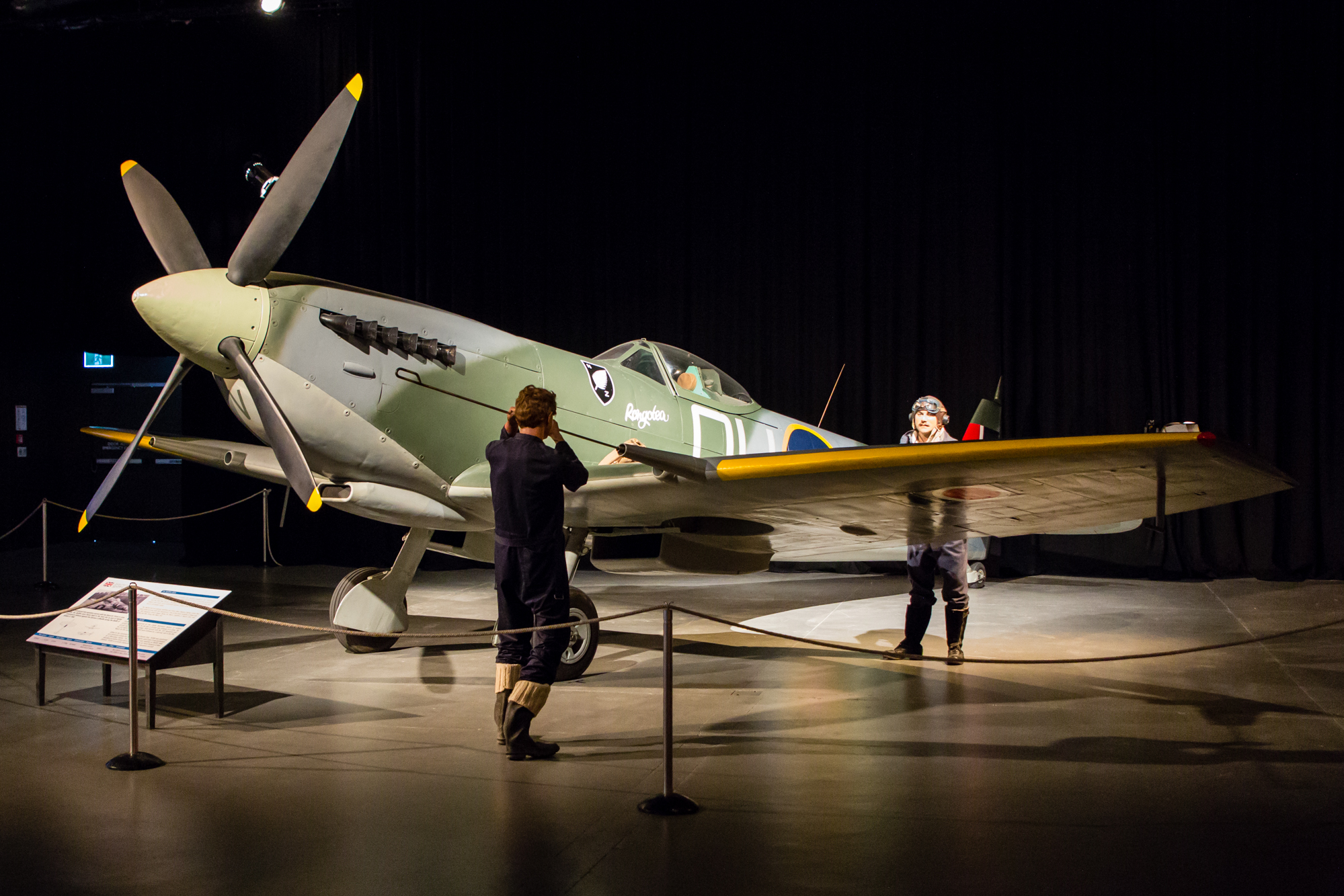
TE288 on display at the RNZAF Museum

- Spitfire LF Mk.XVIe TE288. Taken on charge by the RAF on 1 June 1945, the aircraft served with 61 OTU, 501 Squadron RAuxAF (coded RAB-D), and 102 and 103 Fighter Refresher Schools, until placed into storage in 1951. Also used as a prop in the movie "Reach for the Sky", it then spent time as a gate guard at RAF Rufforth, Church Fenton and finally Dishforth, before it was sold in 1963 to Canterbury Brevet Club, Christchurch, New Zealand. For many years it was mounted on a pole near the entrance to Christchurch International Airport. In 1984 it was donated to the RNZAF Museum and was restored by RNZAF staff at RNZAF Woodbourne. It is displayed at Wigram, without the serial number, as OU-V of No. 485 Squadron RNZAF.
- Spitfire LF Mk.XVIe TE456. Taken on charge by the RAF on 8 August 1945, the aircraft initially went into storage at 6 MU at Brize Norton. It was issued to 501 RAuxAF Squadron at Filton in March 1946 (coded RAB-J), and then to 612 RAuxAF Squadron at Dyce in May 1949, coded 8W-?. In August 1955 it was used in the movie Reach for the Sky. It has been on static display at the Auckland War Memorial Museum, New Zealand, since 1956 when New Zealander Sir Keith Park, wartime commander of No 11 Fighter Group, arranged for it to be donated.

=== Norway ===
Airworthy

- Spitfire Tr.9 EN570 (LN-AOA). Ex Royal Air Force, shot down at Saint-Pol-sur-Ternoise, France, in 1943. Under restoration to flying condition for Norwegian Flying Aces incorporating new fuselage and wings. This was completed in 2024 and made its first post-rebuild flight on 22 April, being delivered to Norwegian Flying Aces in Norway in May.
- Spitfire LF Mk.XVIe RW386 (LN-BSP). Built and delivered to 604 Squadron as NG-D but quickly was removed from service and became a gate guard. Restoration began in 1992 and after a halt, its restoration continued in 2002 with a new owner and was rebuilt to flight in 2007 wearing the original 604 Squadron markings. Initially flying with the register of G-BXVI, it was registered SE-BIR when it was exported to Sweden. In 2020, the owner, Biltema Nordic Services, moved to Norway and the aircraft was subsequently re-registered as LN-BSP.

Static display

- Spitfire LF Mk.IXe MH350. On display at the Norwegian Aviation Museum (Norsk Luftfartsmuseum), Bodø.
- Spitfire PR Mk.XI PL979. On display at the Norwegian Armed Forces Aircraft Collection, Gardermoen, Oslo.

Restoration or stored

- Spitfire Mk IX, MJ785, Ex Royal Norwegian Air Force, crashed in the summer of 1945. Under consideration for restoration to flying condition for Norwegian Flying Aces.
- Spitfire LF Mk.IX MK997. Ex Royal Norwegian Air Force, which crashed into Samsjøen Lake in August 1950, killing the pilot. Wreckage was raised on 13 August 2018. To be restored to flying condition for Norwegian Flying Aces.

=== Poland ===
Static display

- Spitfire LF Mk.XVIe SM411. Assigned to RCAF 421 Sqn in 1944. On display in the Polish Aviation Museum, Kraków. It wears the spurious markings TB995 / ZF-O of 308 (City of Kraków) Sqn RAF. In 1977, this aircraft was sent from the United Kingdom to Poland as part of an exchange between the Polish Aviation Museum and the Royal Air Force Museum. It was swapped for a World War I Airco DH.9A bomber, the only survivor of its type, which is now on display at the Royal Air Force Museum London. Difficulties caused by the then ongoing Cold War meant nearly nine years were spent negotiating the swap.

=== Portugal ===
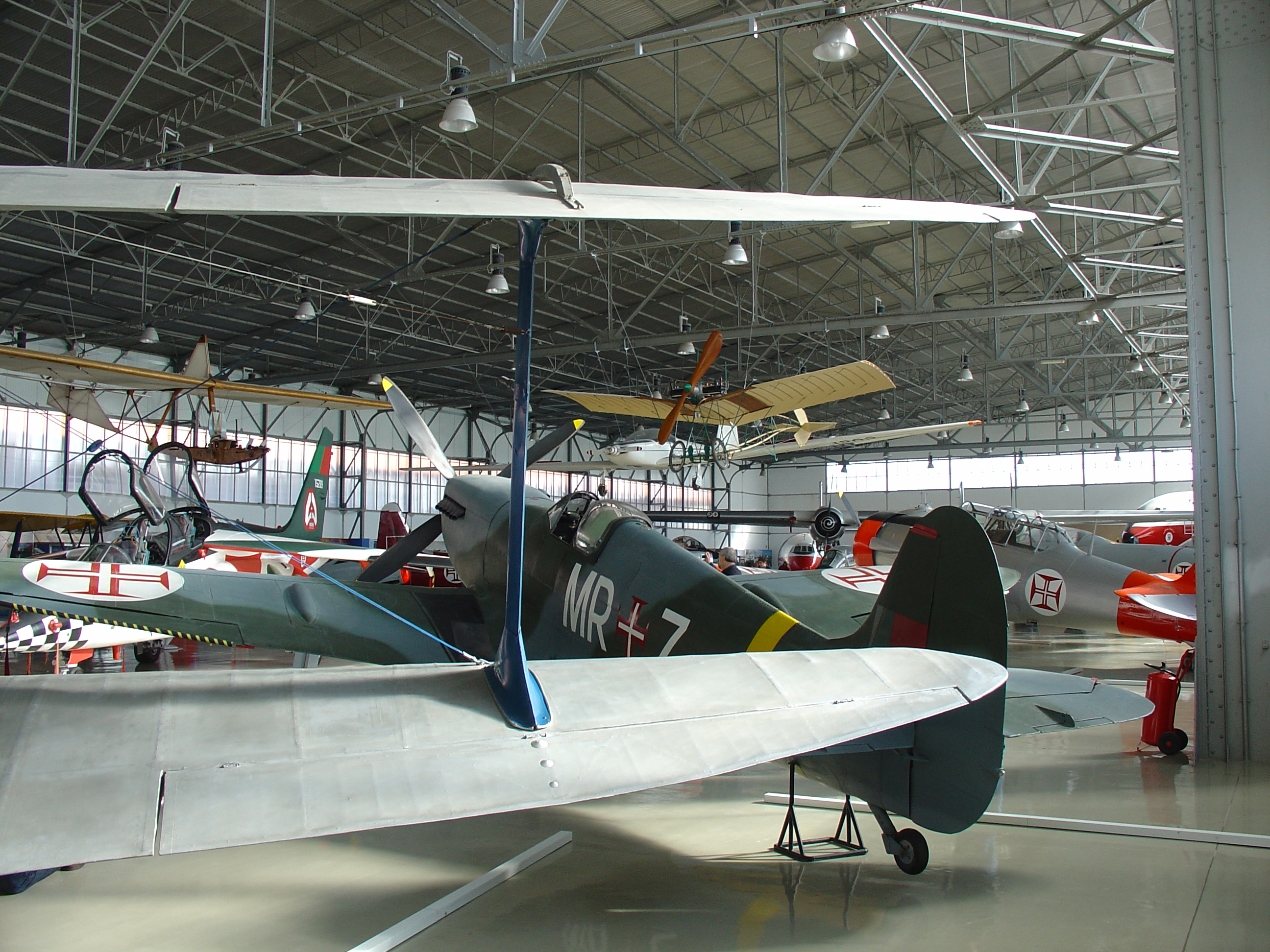
ML255 on display in the Museu do Ar

Static display

- Spitfire HF Mk.IXc ML255. Delivered to the South African Air Force in 1948. After being damaged in a collision at AFB Ysterplaat, it ended up derelict in Snake Valley, Pretoria until it was recovered and restored to static display for the SAAF Museum. It was later transferred to the Museu do Ar, at Sintra in Portugal, wearing the Portuguese Air Force markings ML255 / MR+Z.

=== Serbia ===
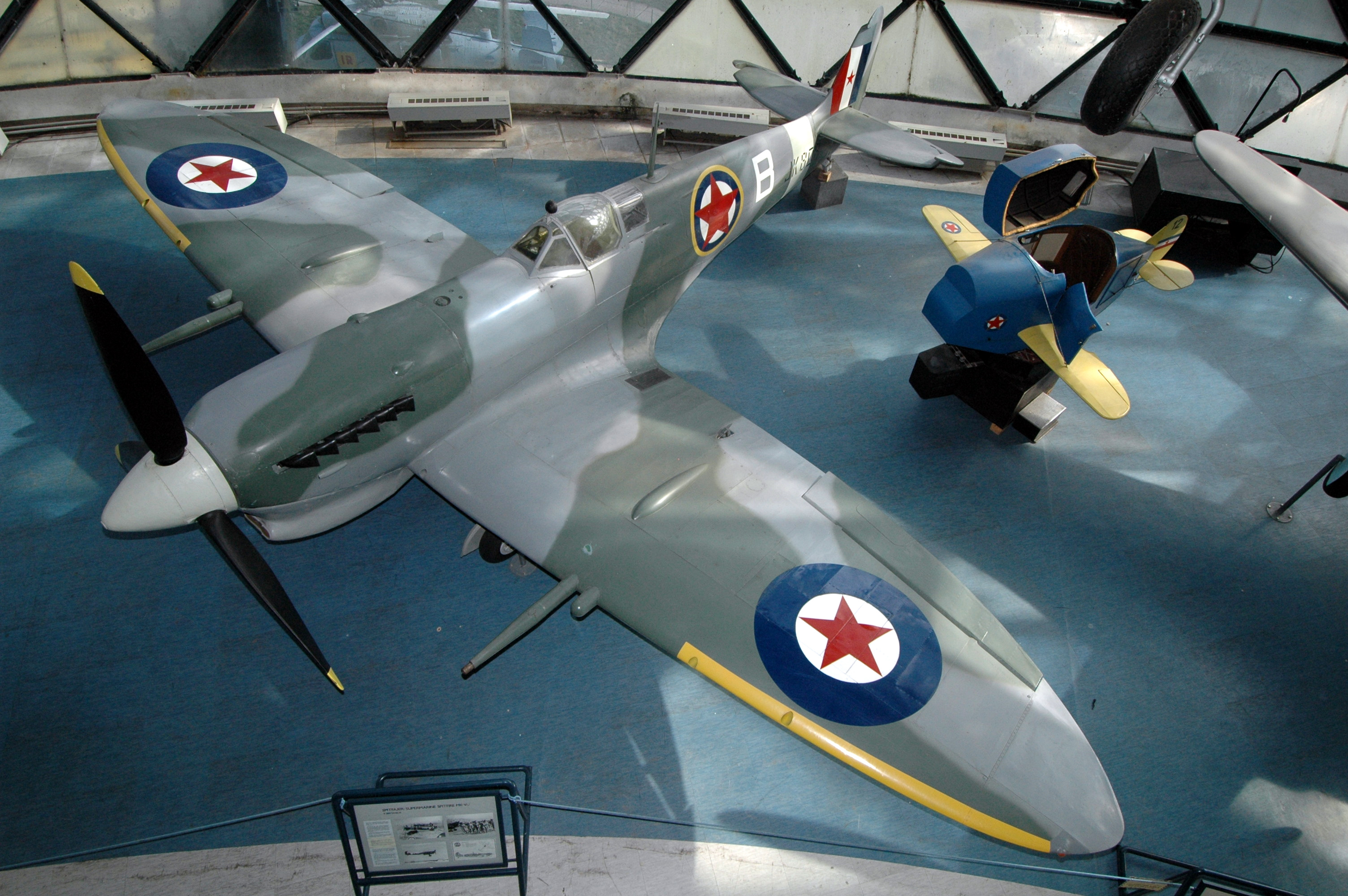
Spitfire Mk VC Trop in Belgrade Aviation Museum

Static display

- Spitfire F Mk.Vc Trop JK808, ser.no. 17-545, While others were scrapped or turned into instructional airframes, 9489 (ex JK808) was handed over to Military Museum in Belgrade. It was put on static display first at Kalemegdan (Belgrade fortress) as a part of the outdoor museum exhibition. There it received a new coat of paint and an incorrect YAF number 9486. After that it was displayed at Belgrade International Airport, as a part of Belgrade Museum of Aviation exhibition, in a purely fictional paint scheme and markings. This caused confusion about aircraft true identity. Spitfire with YAF number 9486 was ex-RAF MH592, which ended as instructional airframe at Rajlovac Air Force Technical Training Center. Aircraft 9489 (JK808) was thoroughly restored during 1973 by Tehnička direkcija JAT (JAT Tehnika ) at Belgrade International Airport. After detailed investigation and several paint schemes applied, (JK448 code name "W" notably) the true identity of this aircraft was confirmed, based on serial numbers found and archive material as JK808, airframe s/n 17-545, built at Castle Bromwich. An article about restoration and the search for true identity was published in 2004.

Aircraft on display contains several non-original parts: engine from another aircraft, Soviet-made camera, landing gear parts, re-manufactured instrument panel, standard RAF instruments and other parts from YAF or JAT stocks.

=== South Africa ===
Static display

- Spitfire HF Mk.VIIIc JF294. Former South African Air Force, serial 5501. On display at the South African National Museum of Military History, Johannesburg.

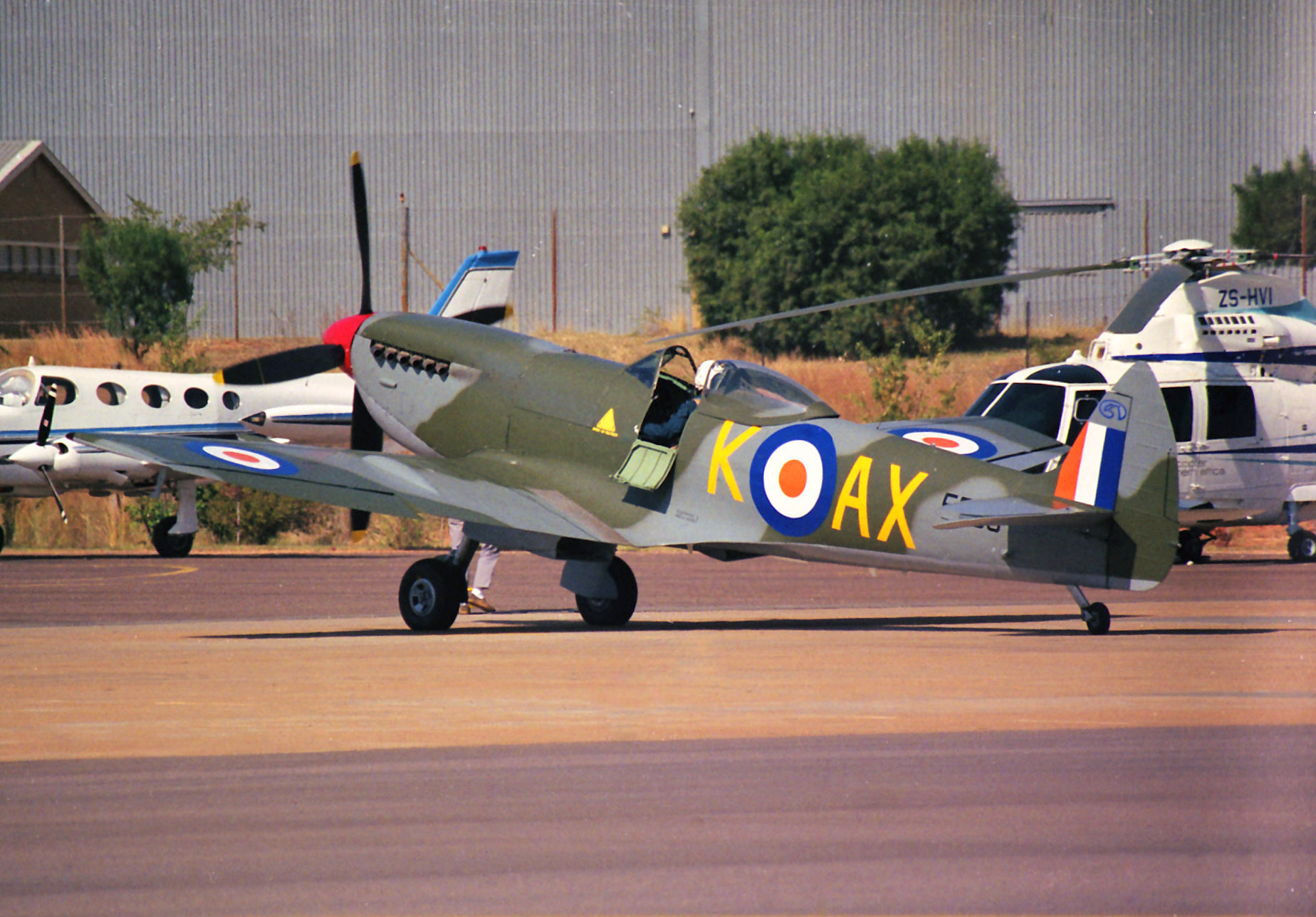
TE213, depicted before its forced landing in 2000

Restoration or stored

- Spitfire LF Mk.IXe TE213. Under restoration at the South African Air Force Museum, AFB Swartkop. Served in the South African Air Force as 5518. Damaged after a forced landing on 15 April 2000 and restoration to airworthy condition is underway

=== Sweden ===
Static display

- Spitfire PR Mk. XIX PM627. On static display at the Flygvapenmuseum. Brought on charge by the RAF in 1945 and struck off charge 1951. The Indian Air Force brought it on charge in 1954 as HS964 before they retired PM627 in 1957. It was put into storage at the Indian AF Museum in New Delhi. In 1971, the Canadian Fighter Pilots Association acquired the aircraft and had it delivered by a Lockheed C-130 Hercules. It was restored for static display in Canada in various locations. The Flygvapenmuseum acquired the plane in 1982, did a full restoration for static display, and put it on public display at their museum in the markings of a Swedish Spitfire: Fv31051.

Restoration or stored

- Spitfire PR Mk. IV BP923. Under restoration to airworthiness. BP923 was built and flown for the RAF in March 1942 and flew with 1 Photo Reconnaissance Unit. It was delivered to the Soviet Air Force in October of that year. The aircraft was believed to have been sent to the scrapyard in 1945 when they were retired. The wreckage was discovered in 1972 in North Norway but only recovered in 1989 and was sent to the Royal Norwegian Air Force Museum. Since the aircraft had no Norwegian history, it was sold to Sven Kindblom of Sweden, who is restoring it to airworthy condition.

=== Thailand ===
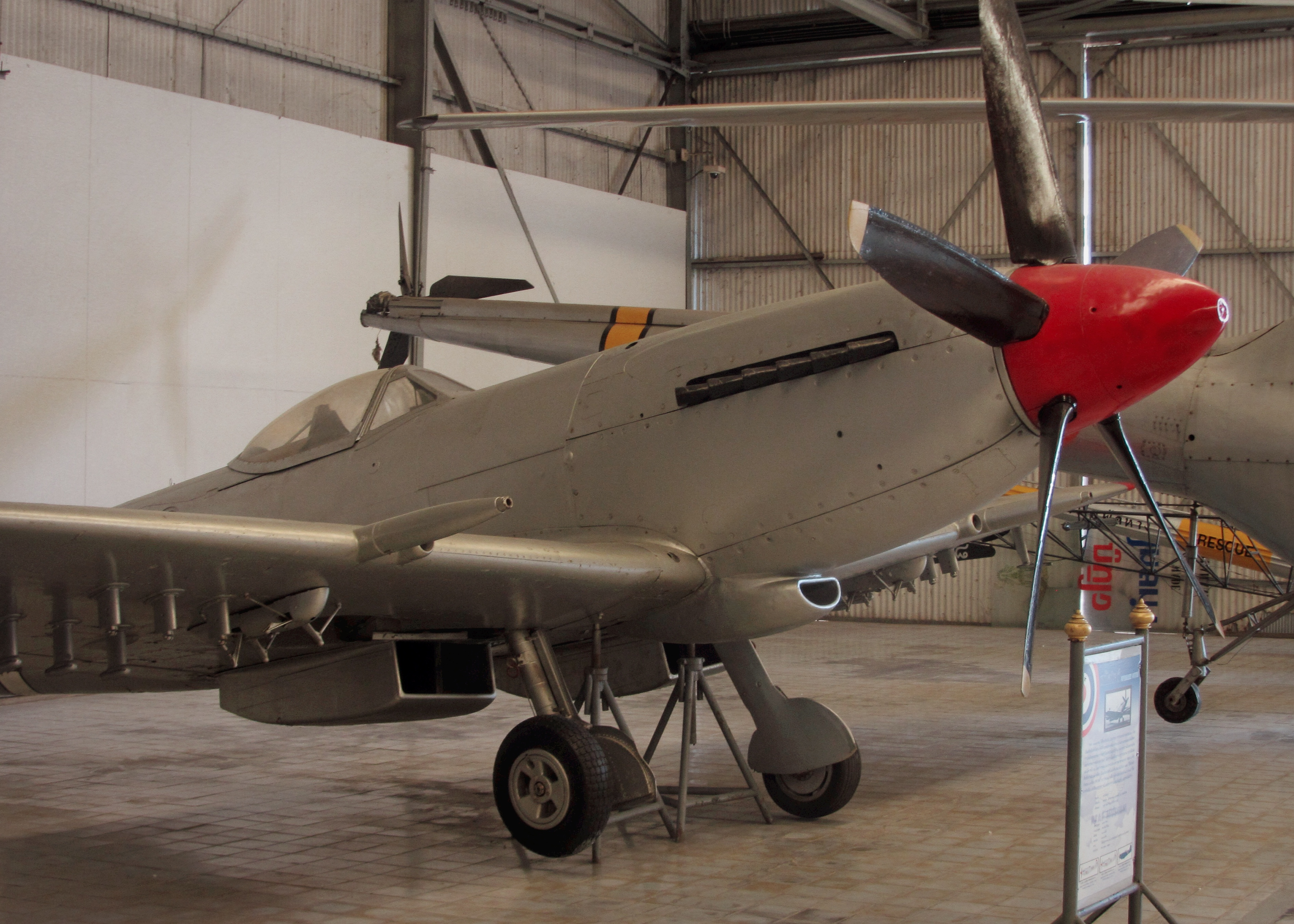
SM914, Thailand, 2014

Static display

- Spitfire FR Mk.XIVe SM914. Royal Thai Air Force serial KH14-1/93. On display at the Royal Thai Air Force Museum, Bangkok, Thailand in Royal Thai Air Force markings with an overall Silver scheme.
- Spitfire PR Mk.XIX PM630. On display at Bangkok-Don Muang. Delivered to the Thai Air Force in 1954 and then moved to the Technical School, Trat, Thailand in 1960. The aircraft was recovered in 1987 and restored for display in 1985.

Restoration or stored

- Spitfire PR Mk. XIX PS836. Under possible restoration to airworthiness. Brought on charge to the Royal Thai Air Force as U14-27/97 in 1954 and was at some point retired before being sent to the Technical School in Chiang Mei, 1978. It was eventually acquired by the RTAF Thai Air Classics/Tango Squadron in 1992 or an airworthy restoration.

=== Turkey ===
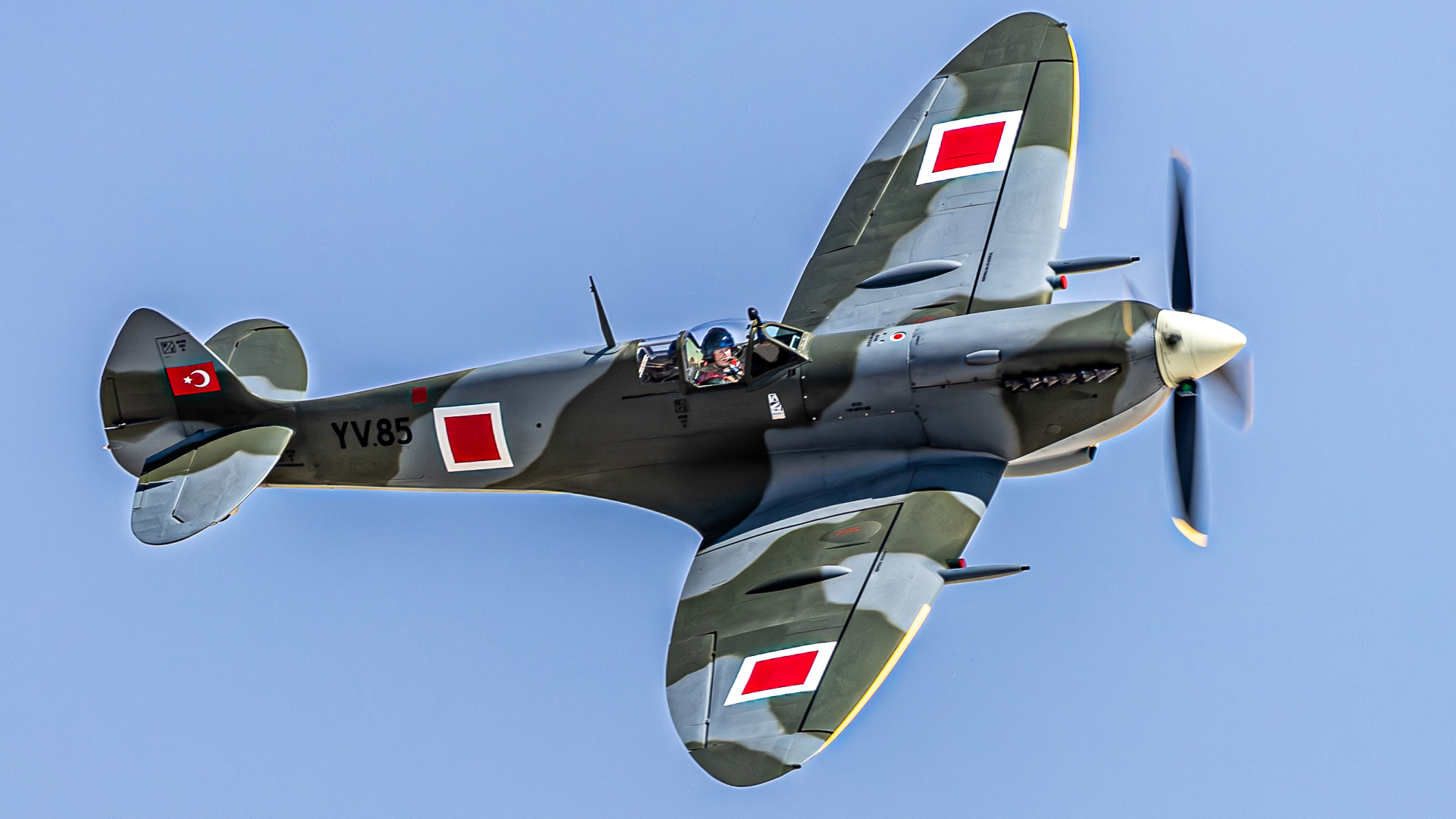
TE517 with Turkish Air Force colours and markings

Airworthy

- Spitfire LF Mk.IX TE517 (YV.85). Airworthy in Turkey. Built and delivered to the RAF in 1945 with No. 313 Squadron RAF before being allocated to the Czech Air Force. The Israeli Air Force acquired the Spitfire in 1948 as 20–46. It was acquired by Robs Lamplough in 1977 and had the registration G-BIXP but not taken up. Charles Church acquired the remains in 1984 and had it registered as G-CCIX before being acquired by Kermit Weeks in 1992 after Charles Church's death. It was sold to Peter Monk at the Biggin Hill Heritage Hangar to be rebuilt to fly as G-JGCA. This was completed in 2023 and it flew again on 5 April. Following its sale to Ali İsmet Öztürk’s M.S.Ö. Air & Space Museum on 26 May 2024, the aircraft was moved to Turkey. TE517 was restored to the historical colours and markings of the Turkish Air Force on 20 July 2024, and has the call sign YV.85 in tribute to the Turkish Air Force's "Yavuz" (YV) Spitfire Fleet based out of Merzifon.

=== United Kingdom ===
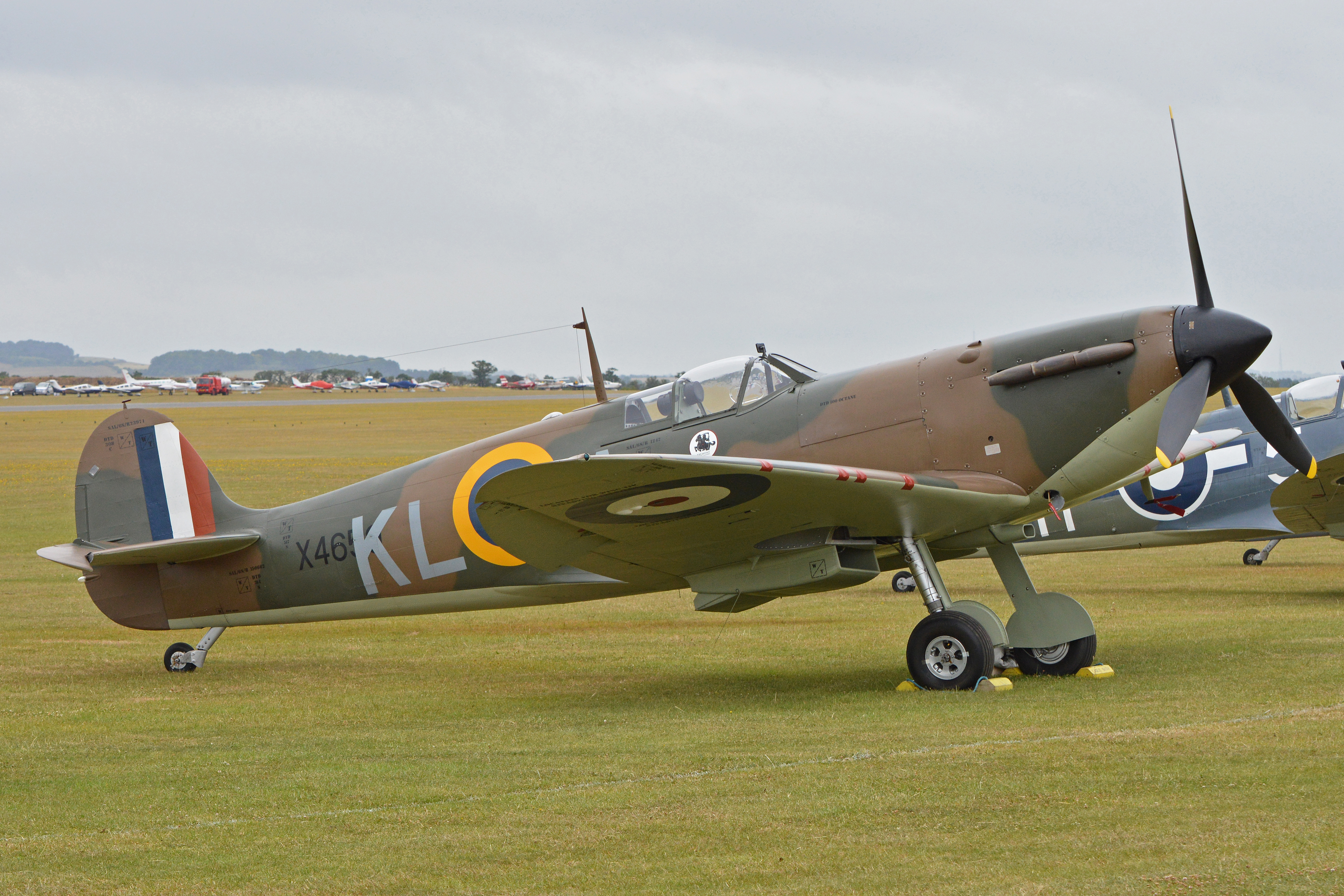
X4650 on the grass, Duxford, July 2015

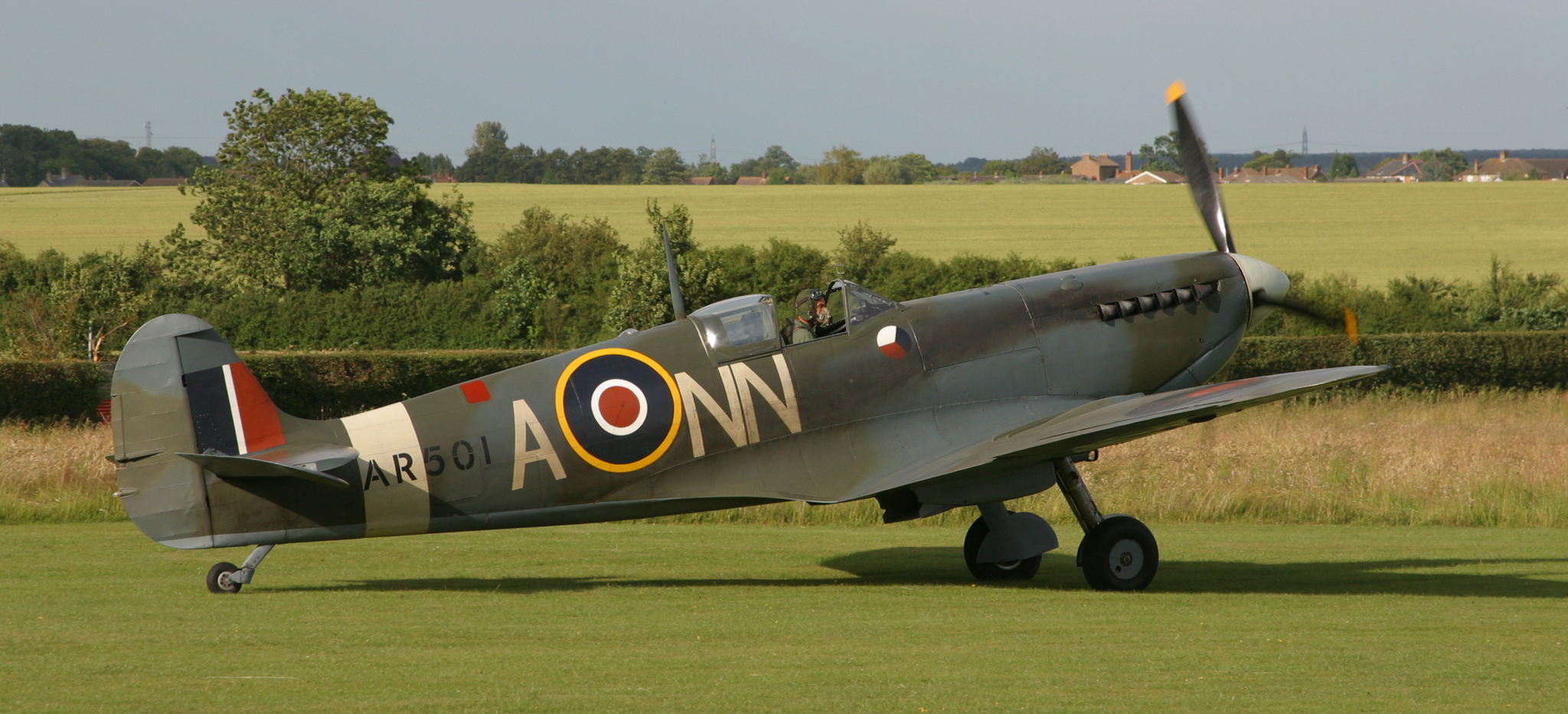
AR501 at Old Warden, 2004

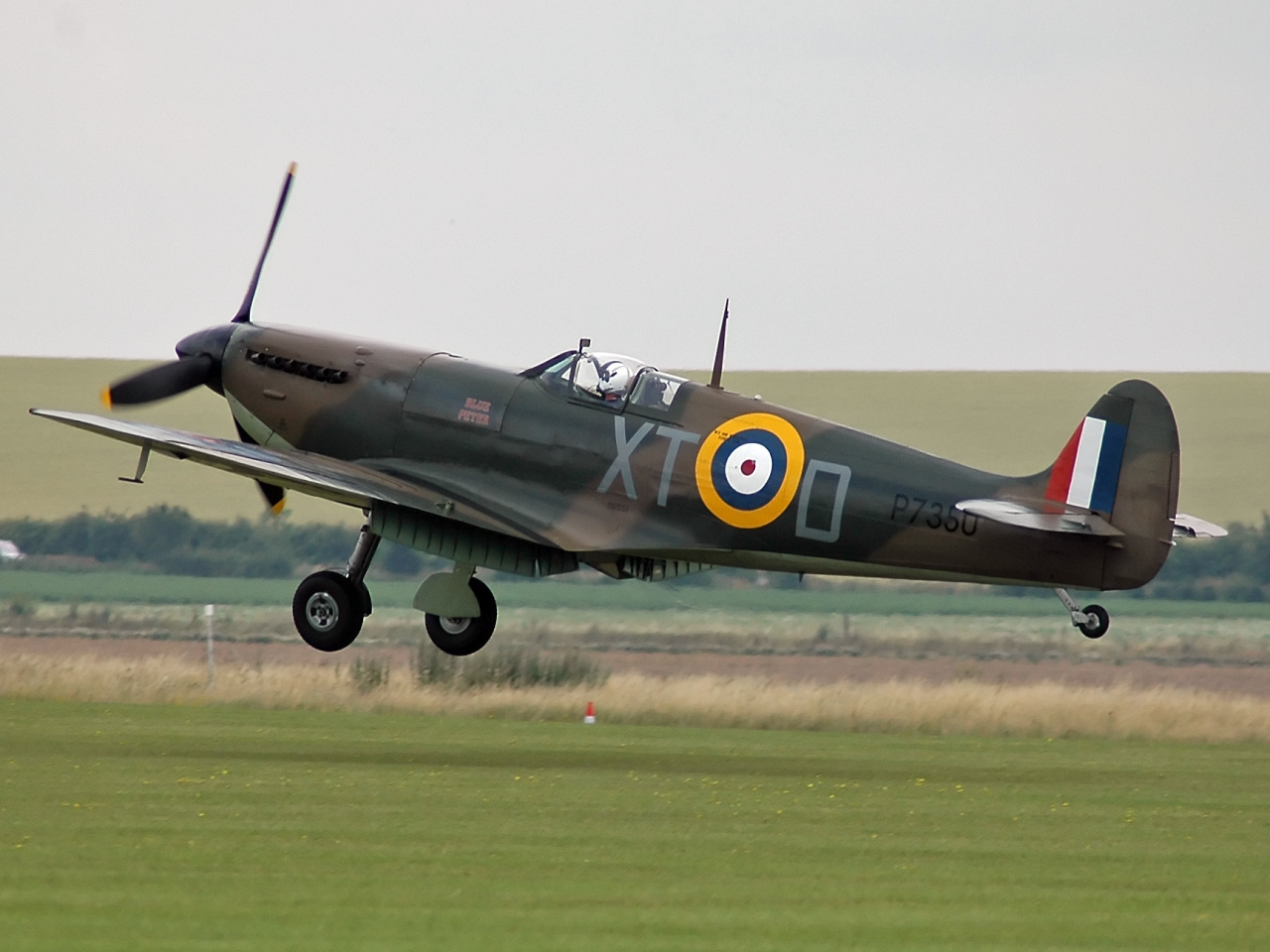
P7350 today flies with the Battle of Britain Memorial Flight in the UK

Airworthy

- Spitfire F Mk.Ia N3200 (G-CFGJ). Owned by the Imperial War Museum and operated by the Aircraft Restoration Company (ARCo), based at Duxford Airfield. Ex 19 Sqn machine, it carries the QV squadron codes it wore when it was shot down on 26 May 1940 in support of the Operation Dynamo evacuation of Dunkirk with Sqn Ldr Geoffrey Stevenson, 19 Sqn OC, at the controls. N3200 was restored to airworthy condition by Historic Flying Limited, Duxford and is arguably the most authentically restored Spitfire in existence. Its first post-restoration flight took place on 26 March 2014 from the airfield. Donated to the Imperial War Museum on 9 July 2015 by American billionaire and conservationist Thomas Kaplan (aka Mark One Partnership LLC), accepted on behalf of the museum by its Patron, Prince William (Duke of Cambridge).
- Spitfire F Mk.Ia P9372 (G-CLIH). Airworthy at Biggin Hill, Kent. Dutch sources report she is owned by Dutchman Frits van Eerd, CEO of Dutch supermarket chain Jumbo. It was restored by the Biggin Hill Heritage Hangar, which completed the restoration in 2025, and it flew again on 22 April.
- Spitfire F Mk.Ia X4650 (G-CGUK). Owned by Comanche Warbirds. X4650 was built in October 1940 and was delivered to 54 Squadron with the codes KL-A. It crashed in December 1940 before it was struck off charge in June 1941. The remains were recovered in 1976 and a restoration began at Biggin Hill and had its first post-restoration flight in March 2012.
- Spitfire F Mk.Ia AR213 (G-AIST). Acquired by Group Captain Allen H. Wheeler on 25 October 1946. In 1968 it flew in the film Battle of Britain. In April 1989 it was acquired by Sheringham Aviation. In 2002 it underwent another restoration, repainted with 57 OTU colours, and coded "JZ-E". It featured in the 2017 film Dunkirk.
- Spitfire F Mk.IIa P7350. Operated by the RAF Battle of Britain Memorial Flight at RAF Coningsby in Lincolnshire. It is the only surviving Spitfire from the Battle of Britain still flying and is believed to be the 14th aircraft of the 11,989 built at Castle Bromwich. The aircraft entered service in August 1940 and during the battle served with 266 and 603 Squadrons.
- Spitfire LF Mk.Vb AB910. Operated by the RAF Battle of Britain Memorial Flight at RAF Coningsby in Lincolnshire. Built at Castle Bromwich in 1941 and has a front-line operational career spanning almost four years.
- Spitfire LF Mk.Vc AR501 (G-AWII). Maintained in an airworthy condition with the Shuttleworth Collection, returned to airworthy status in March 2018 following a rebuild. AR501 was built by Westland Aircraft at Yeovil and flown by No. 310 (Czech) Squadron at RAF Duxford as AR501 / NN-A in 1942, where it escorted USAAF Boeing B-17 Flying Fortress and Consolidated B-24 Liberator bombers. Joined the Shuttleworth Collection in 1961, it featured in the 1969 film The Battle of Britain.
- Spitfire F Mk.Vb BM597 (G-MKVB). Owned by Historic Aircraft Collection. Built in 1942 and delivered to 315 Squadron as PK-C and later 317 Squadron as JH-C, both Polish Squadrons stationed at RAF Woodvale. After its RAF service was complete, it became a gate guard at multiple air bases and was to make moulds for replica Spitfires for the Battle of Britain movie. In 1989, the founder of Historic Flying, Tim Routsis, made a deal with the RAF to purchase the aircraft so it could be restored. He sold it to the Historic Aircraft Collection in 1993, which completed the restoration and had its first post-rebuild flight in 1997. The aircraft is finished in its original 317 Squadron markings but with an earlier camouflage scheme (brown and green as opposed to grey and green).
- Spitfire F Mk.Vc EE602 (G-IBSY). The first post-restoration flight took place on 15 May 2015 at Biggin Hill with Peter Monk at the controls. Restoration carried out over 3 years by the Biggin Hill Heritage Hangar, Biggin Hill. It wears its original markings DV-V from No. 129 (Mysore) Sqn RAF, along with the authentic inscription 'CENTRAL RAILWAYS URUGUAYAN STAFF' to replicate the markings it wore as a presentation aircraft donated by the British Community in Uruguay.

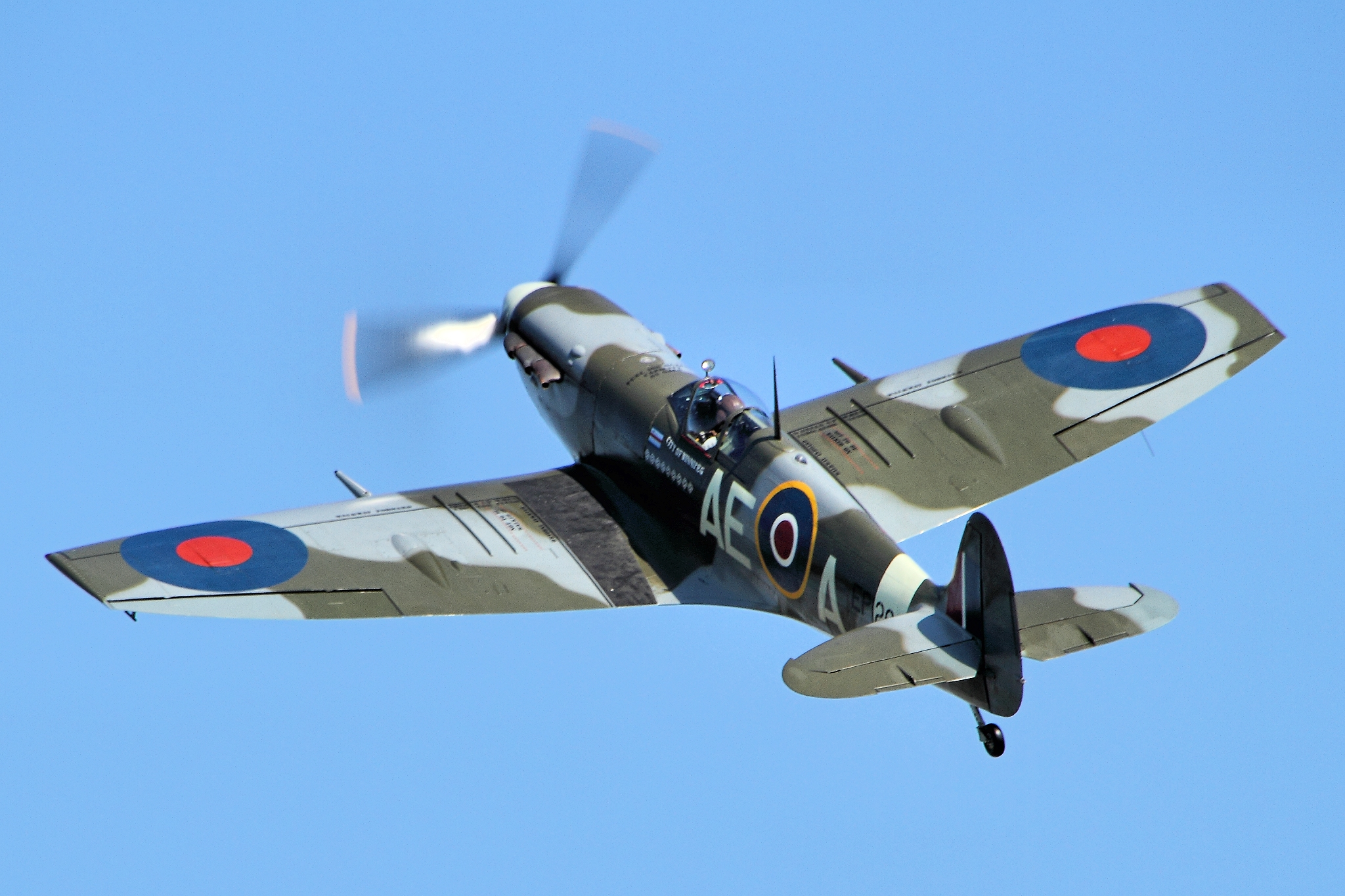
EP120 displaying at Duxford

- Spitfire LF Mk.Vb EP120 (G-LFVB). Owned by The Fighter Collection, based at Duxford. Built at Castle Bromwich in 1942 and delivered to 501 Squadron where it got six kills while being flown by Sqn Ldr Geoffrey Northcott. It suffered a ground collision and was repaired by CB before joining 19 Squadron. EP120 was delivered to 402 Squadron in 1944 and given the codes AE-A. After the war, it became a gate guard and later, a star in the Battle of Britain movie, before moving into storage in 1989. Acquired by The Fighter Collection in 1993 and had its first flight since restoration in 1995. The aircraft is in its original 402 Squadron markings of AE-A.
- Spitfire F Mk.Vc JG891 (G-LFVC). Owned by Comanche Fighters and operated with the assistance of the Aircraft Restoration Company (ARCo), based in the UK. Built in 1942 and delivered to the RAAF as A58-178, it flew with the RAAF until it was involved in a landing accident in 1944 and was written off. The aircraft was rebuilt and flew again in 2006 with the registration G-LFVC before going to the United States, registered as N5TF with the Comanche Fighters, Texas. The Spitfire was involved in a landing accident in July 2017 and was later exported back to the United Kingdom on 25 October 2017 and deregistered from the FAA civil register. It was reregistered as G-LFVC on 31 October 2017 and flew again on 6 July 2018 and is in the markings of a 249 Squadron Spitfire.
- Spitfire Mk.VIII MT818 (G-AIDN). Airworthy in the UK. Two-seat trainer built in 1944, restored to airworthy condition by Personal Plane Services, Booker, Buckinghamshire, last seen flying on 30 June 2024. Based at London Biggin Hill Airport.
- Spitfire Mk.VIIIc MV154 (G-BKMI). Airworthy in the UK. Built at Supermarine Southampton in 1944, it was delivered by famous ATA pilot Mary Wilkens to 6 Maintenance Unit before it was shipped to Australia for the RAAF as A58-671. It never saw service and remained in storage until 1994, when it was rebuilt to fly with the UK civil register G-BKMI and wears the markings of Spitfire Mk.VIII MT928, a Spitfire which served with No. 154 Squadron. It was later sold to Meier Motors in Germany and subsequently re-registered as D-FEUR. The aircraft suffered a prop strike in 2019 during the Battle of Britain Airshow at Duxford in September. The aircraft has since been repaired by the Aircraft Restoration Company (ARCo), re-registered as G-BKMI and has flown in the UK.
- Spitfire Tr.9 BS410 (G-TCHI). Airworthy in the UK. This Spitfire joined 315 Squadron in 1942 and flew with the squadron until it crashed in 1943, taking F/O Piotr Kuryllowicz as Prisoner of War. The remains were recovered in 2005, acquired by Martin Phillips and sent to Biggin Hill to have it rebuilt to airworthy condition. On 8 April 2022, this Spitfire made its first flight post restoration from Biggin Hill.
- Spitfire F Mk.IXc LZ842 (G-CGZU). Airworthy at Biggin Hill. This aircraft flew with various squadrons in the Malta Campaign, which include 93 Squadron, 232 Squadron (where it wore the codes EF-F) & 327 Squadron. Afterwards it flew with the South African Air Force in 1948. Restoration in the UK included the aircraft being repainted as it did when it was with 232 Squadron as EF-F and the fitting of a Rolls-Royce Merlin X. LZ842 took to the air for the first time post-restoration on 23 June 2021 out of Biggin Hill.
- Spitfire LF Mk.IXc MH415 (G-AVDJ). Owned by Warbirds Flight Club Pty Ltd, Hunter Valley NSW, being restored to flying condition. Previously owned by Wilson 'Connie' Edwards and stored at his facility in Big Spring, Texas for decades. During its time with 'Connie' Edwards it wore the codes ZD-E to replicate the colours and markings it wore during its service with No. 222 (Natal) Squadron RAF during 1943. Its FAA registration was cancelled, sold via Platinum Fighter Sales in October 2015 and subsequently transported to Australia. After 5 years of work, it was exported to the UK to fly right before the COVID-19 pandemic struck. The first post-restoration flight for this aircraft finally took place on 8 April 2021 out of Sywell Aerodrome.

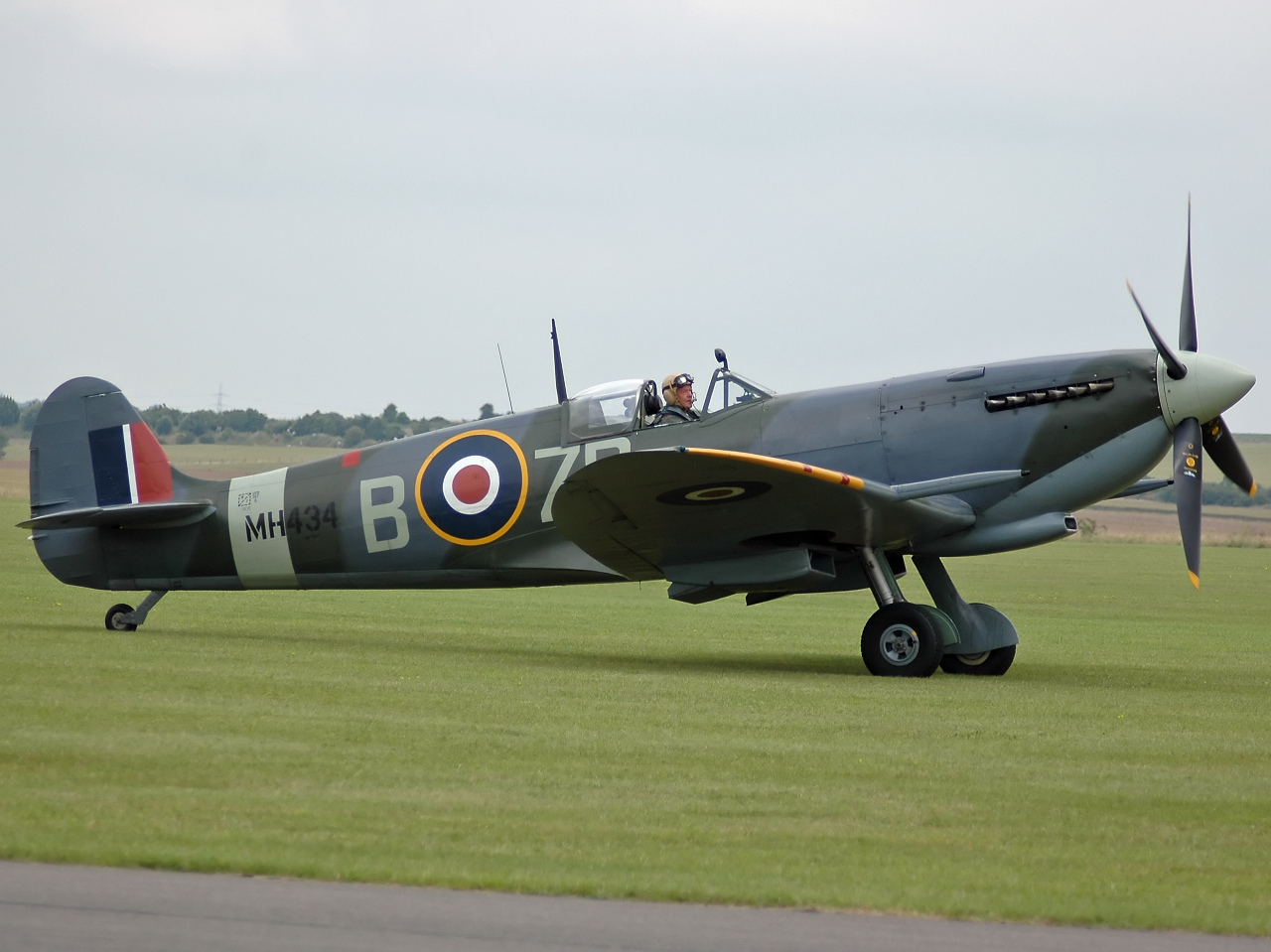
MH434 in the markings of 222 Squadron, Duxford, 2005.

- Spitfire LF Mk.IXb MH434 (G-ASJV). Owned and operated by The Old Flying Machine Company and based at Duxford. Built at Castle Bromwich, MH434 shot down an Fw 190 in 1943 while serving on 222 Squadron. From the 1980s it was usually flown by Ray Hanna, ex-Red Arrows leader and display pilot up until his death in late 2005. 'MH434' has featured at European air shows and has been in many other TV and films including Operation Crossbow, The Longest day, Battle of Britain, Foyle's War .
- Spitfire Tr.9 MJ444 (G-LEGD). Under restoration to fly. Originally built as an LF Mk.IX, MJ444 was built in 1943 and first flew with No. 411 Squadron RCAF in September 1944. No. 403 Squadron RCAF later took "ownership" of the aircraft before being transferred to No. 443 Squadron in December 1944, before in January 1945, was shot down over Belgium. MJ444 was recovered at some point and is being rebuilt by the Aircraft Restoration Company (ARCo) as a two-seater with the registration G-LEGD, which will fly alongside another ex No.411 squadron aircraft: NH341, already airworthy with Aero Legends. This was completed on 6 June 2024, when it made its first post-rebuild flight, given the name 'Lady Luck'.
- Spitfire LF Mk.IXc MK912 (G-BRRA). Built in 1944, this Spitfire flew for the RAF both during and after the Second World War for a number of different air forces, until being damaged in 1953. Passing through various collections, it was restored between 1992 and 2000, flying again on 8 September 2000. Previously owned and flown by Ed Russell in Niagara Falls, Ontario, MK912 was sold in 2011 to Biggin Hill, Kent. The aircraft made a forced landing at Biggin Hill due to a loss of engine power on 1 August 2015, this tore off the right wing and caused other substantial damage. Almost nine years to the day since the accident, it flew again from Biggin Hill, repainted in its original 312 Squadron D-Day markings of 'DU-V'.
- Spitfire Tr.9 ML295 (G-CLXB). Airworthy in the UK. Originally built as an LF Mk. IXb. Delivered to 39 Maintenance Unit in 1943 and later that year, delivered to No. 411 Squadron RCAF. It was shot down on 30 July 1944 and later excavated in the 1990s. ML295 was revealed at Biggin Hill as a two-seat Spitfire being rebuilt there and took to the air post-restoration on 14 January 2022.

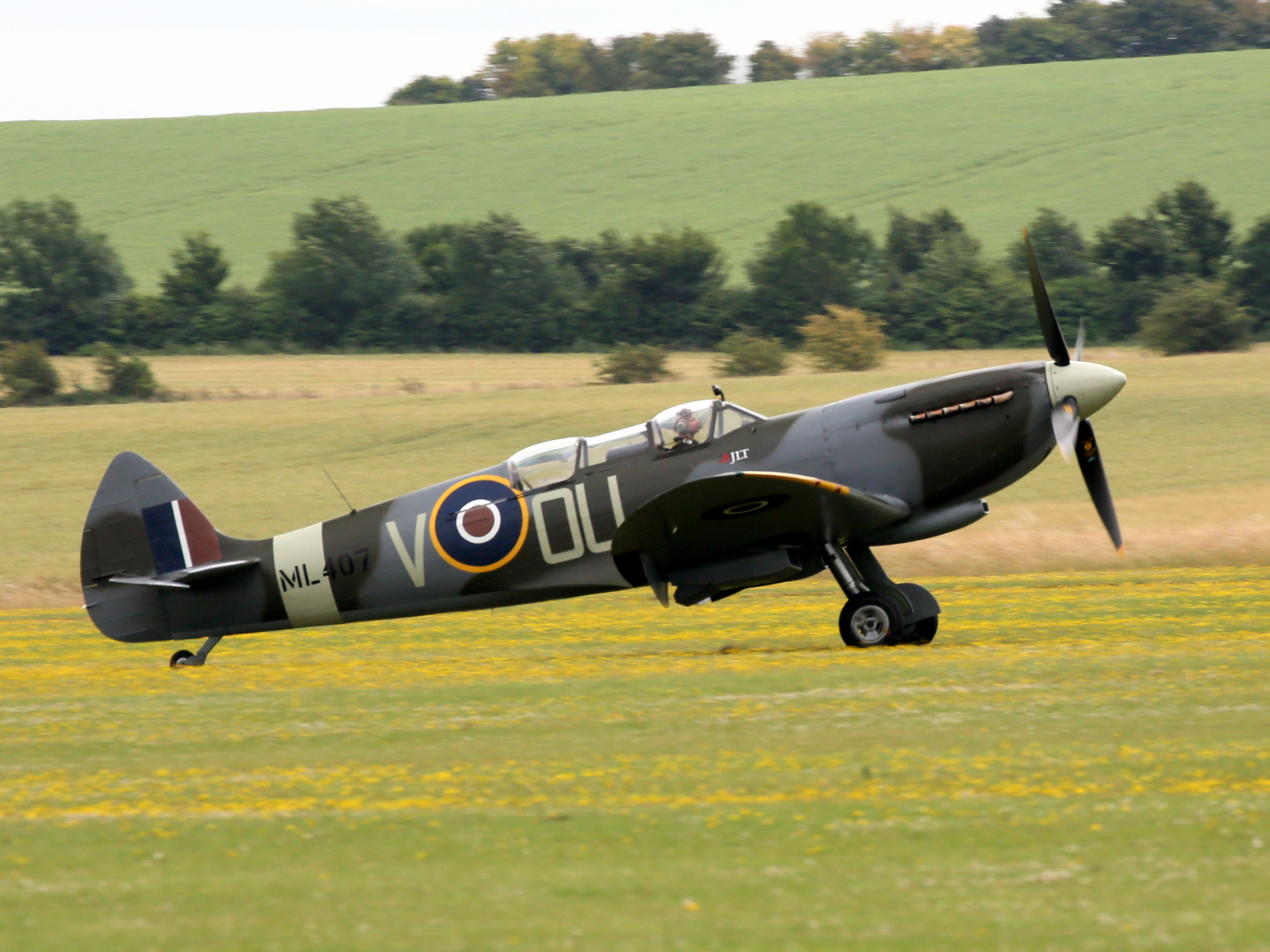
ML407 "The Grace Spitfire", Duxford 2001. An ex 485(NZ) Squadron Spitfire LF Mk IX which operated over the beach-head on D-Day.

- Spitfire Tr.9 ML407 (G-LFIX). Served with 485 Squadron, Royal New Zealand Air Force as OU-V. Participated in Operation Overlord. Subsequently, served with 341 Squadron, Royal Air Force coded NL-D, 308 Squadron, coded ZF-R, 349 Squadron, coded GE-P, 345 Squadron, coded 2Y-A and 332 Squadron, coded AH-B. To 151 Repair Unit in April 1945 and 29 Maintenance Unit in October 1945. Sold to Vickers-Armstrongs in 1950 and converted to a two-seat trainer. Flew under Class B markings G-15-175. To Irish Air Corps in August 1951 as IAC 162. Withdrawn from service on 8 July 1960 and stored. Sold to Tony Samuelson in March 1968, then to Sir William Roberts in 1970 and Nick Grace in 1979. Restored to airworthy condition in 1985, registered G-LFIX. Owned by Carolyn Grace and as of October 2016 based at Sywell, it wears the markings it wore when serving with 485 (New Zealand) Squadron.
- Spitfire LF Mk.IXc ML417 (N2TF). Delivered to 443 RCAF Squadron in 1944 before being converted as a two-seater for the Indian Air Force as HS543 in 1948. It was brought back to the UK to join The Fighter Collection and was rebuilt as a single seater in its original 443 Squadron Markings. Becoming airworthy in the UK in 1984 with the registration G-BJSG, it went to the United States in 2001 and registered N2TF. It came back to the UK for some restoration work to be done and remerged in 2023 as a complete airframe, taking flight on June 20.
- Spitfire Tr.9 NH341 (G-CICK). Rebuilt to airworthy condition by the Aircraft Restoration Company (ARCo) (formally Historic Flying Limited) at Duxford. Restored as a two-seat Tr.9. A former 411 Sqn machine, it wears the codes DB-E it wore when in service with the squadron.
- Spitfire Tr.9 PT462 (G-CTIX). Owned by the Aircraft Restoration Company (ARCo) and operated by Aerial Collective Duxford. It wears the markings SW-A of 253 Sqn RAF.
- Spitfire F Mk.IX PT879 (G-PTIX). PT879 was built in 1944 and was delivered to Russia to be part of 2nd squadron, 767th Regiment, 122nd Division of the Russian Air Force. After 29 hours of service, it crashed in 1945 and was recovered completely by a socialist-capitalist farmer (who may have seen value in the aircraft in the future). Peter Monk purchased the Spitfire in 1998 and brought it to the UK. It was later acquired by Peter Teichman, owner of the Hangar 11 Collection for restoration. The aircraft took to the skies over Biggin Hill on 28 October 2020.
- Spitfire Tr.9 PV202 (G-CCCA). Served with 33 Squadron, 5R-Q, then with 412 Squadron as WZ-M, later coded WZ-W. To 29 Maintenance Unit in July 1945. Sold to Vickers-Armstrongs in 1950 and converted to two-seat trainer. Carried Class B marks G-15-174. To Irish Air Corps in June 1951 as IAC 161. Flew until 1 December 1960 when withdrawn from active service due to a crack in the undercarriage strut. Became an instructional airframe. Sold to Sir William Roberts in April 1970, to Strathallan Collection in 1972. Sold in 1979 to Nick Grace, later sold to Steve Atkins. Registered G-BHGH, later re-registered G-TRIX. Subsequently, sold to Richard Parker and restored to airworthy condition, it was flown again after restoration on 23 February 1990. Sold to Rick Roberts in 1992. Following a major accident at Goodwood in April 2000, the aircraft was sold to Karel Bos / Historic Flying Limited, based at Duxford and was rebuilt. Re-registered G-CCCA. Returned to an airworthy condition as Irish Air Corps IAC 161, subsequently operated in Royal Netherlands Air Force livery as H-98. As of October 2016, airworthy marked as 5R-H. Operated by the Aircraft Restoration Company (ARCo) and Aerial Collective Duxford, based at Duxford.
- Spitfire HF Mk.IXe RR232 (G-BRSF). Built at Castle Bromwich in 1943 and returned to the UK by the late Jim Pearce in 1989, now owned by Martin Phillips, operated by Spitfires.com and based at Goodwood Aerodrome, West Sussex.
- Spitfire Tr.9 SM520 (G-ILDA). Spitfire Tr.9 SM520 (G-ILDA). Originally built in 1944 at Castle Bromwich under construction number CBAF10164. Found in a Scrap yard in South Africa in the 1980’s and restored to airworthy condition in 2008. Owned and operated by Spitfires.com, based at Goodwood Aerodrome, West Sussex and Solent Airport, Hampshire for Spitfire experience flights and Spitfire pilot training.

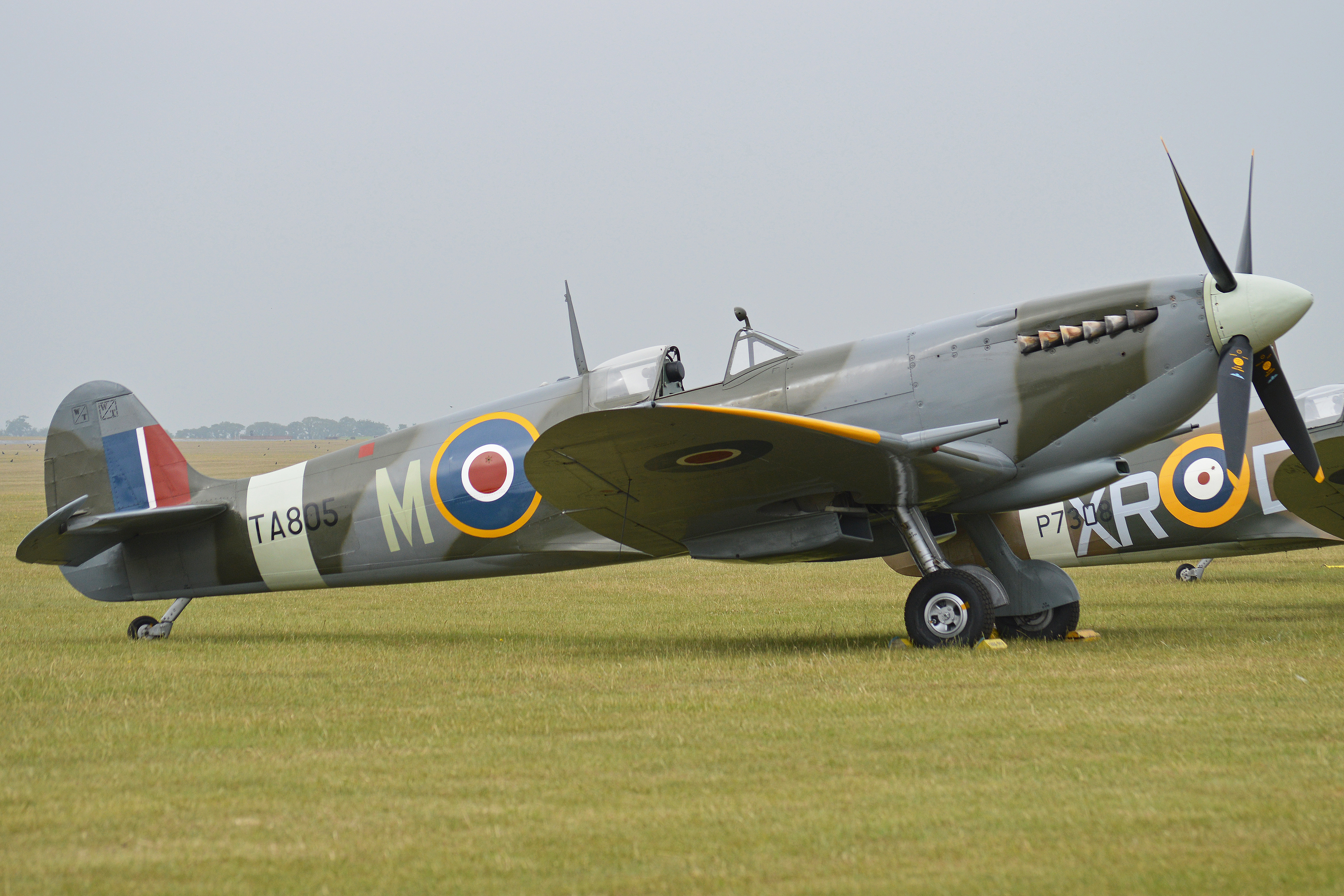
TA805 on airshow display at Duxford

- Spitfire HF Mk.IXe TA805 (G-PMNF). Flies from the former RAF station at Biggin Hill. After the war, it was used by the South African Air Force, recovered from a scrap yard, and returned to England in the early 1990s. It wears 234 Squadron markings FX-M.
- Spitfire HF Mk.IXe TD314 (G-CGYJ). Operated by Aero Legends and maintained by the Aircraft Restoration Company (ARCo) at Duxford. This Spitfire was built as one of the last high-back Spitfires built in late 1944. It saw service in the RAF with 183 Squadron and 234 Squadron before it was delivered to the SAAF. It ended up in a scrapyard in South Africa in 1954 and was later rescued in 1969. After multiple owners over many years it ended up in Canada in 2009, which was where Aero Legends acquired it in 2011 and restored it to airworthy condition, with its first post-restoration flight on 7 December 2013.

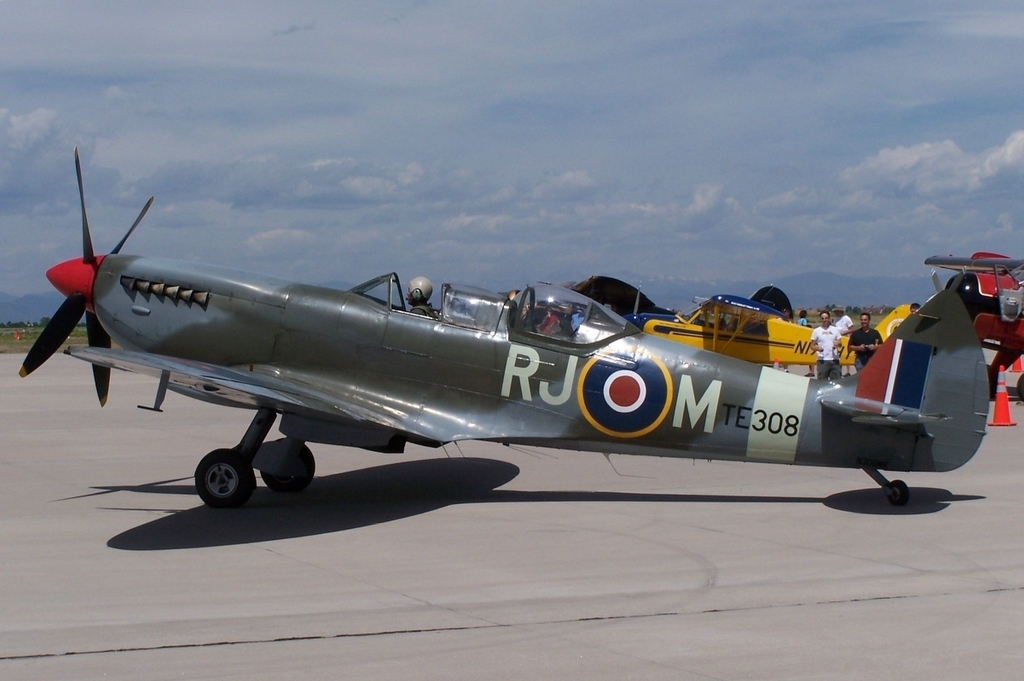
TE308 at an airshow, 2006

- Spitfire Tr.9 TE308 (G-AWGB). Initially allocated to 33 Maintenance Unit, then to 29 Maintenance Unit. Sold to Vickers-Armstrongs in July 1950. Converted to a two-seat trainer. Flew under Class B markings G-15-176. To Irish Air Corps in July 1951 as IAC 163. Wheels-up landing on delivery at Baldonnel Airfield on 30 July. Withdrawn from service 9 September 1961. Sold to Tony Samuelson in April 1968, registered G-AWGB. Restored to flying condition in a month. Appeared in the movie Battle of Britain and was also used for aerial filming where a camera was placed in the front cockpit allowing 'through the windscreen' shots to be captured, many of which appear in the film. Sold to Sir William Roberts in April 1970 then sold to Don Plumb in July. Registered CF-RAF. Reconverted to single-seater in 1973. Sold to Thomas Watson and registered N92477. Sold to Woodson K. Woods and reconverted to two-seater in 1979, re-registered N308WK. Sold to Bill Greenwood in 1983. Suffered an accident at Galveston, Texas on 26 April 2008. As of October 2016, under restoration to airworthy condition by QG Aviation. Its US civil register of N308WK was cancelled and was sold to the Biggin Hill Heritage Hangar in 2019. The Spitfire flew again in August 2020 in the markings of No. 457 Squadron RAAF.

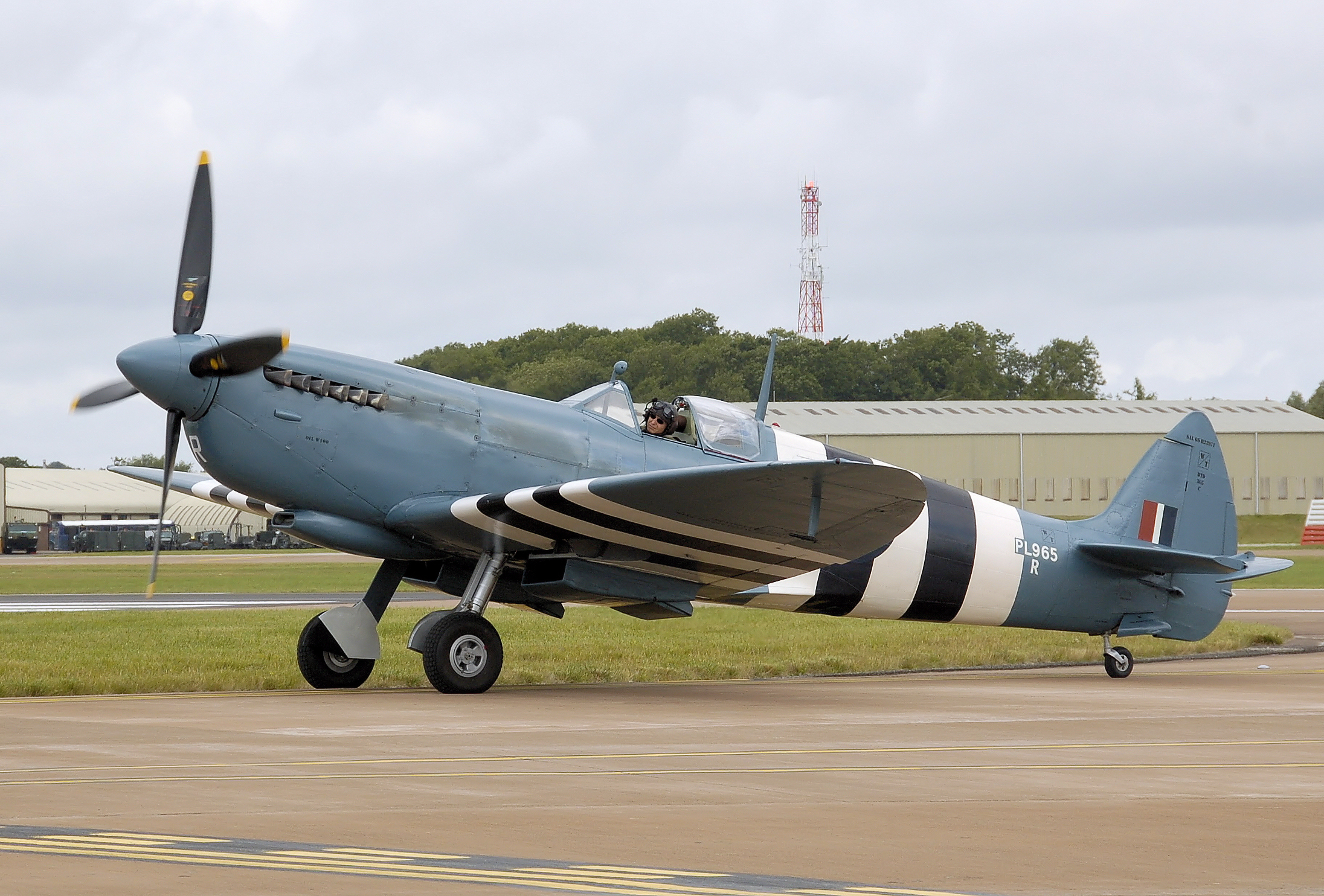
PL965 taxying out for a display

- Spitfire PR Mk.XI PL965 (G-MKXI). Operated by the Hangar 11 Collection at North Weald. The aircraft conducted over forty operational sorties with 16 Squadron 1944–45.
- Spitfire PR Mk.XI PL983 (G-PRXI). Owned by the Aircraft Restoration Company (ARCo) at Duxford. Ex RAF Photo-reconnaissance HQ and United States Embassy Flight. Restored to airworthy condition and flew in May 2018, but suffered an undercarriage collapse on landing at Midden-Zeeland Airfield, Netherlands on 22 August 2019.
- Spitfire FR Mk.XIV MV293 (G-SPIT). Built in late 1944 and was sent to the Royal Indian Air Force in 1945. Nothing is known about its service in India, but the airframe was brought back to the UK in 1978 by Warbirds of Great Britain for restoration. Initially registered as G-BGHB but was later registered as G-SPIT before being acquired by The Fighter Collection and had its first flight after restoration in 1992. The plane used to be painted as an overall silver with codes OI-C to represent post-war RAF Spitfires, but in 2000 it was repainted in the markings of MV268, JE-J, the markings of Johnnie Johnson's Spitfire Mk.XIV.
- Spitfire F Mk.XIVe RN201 (G-BSKP). Delivered to Belgian Air Force in 1948 as SG.31, where it served until it was mounted on a plinth after retirement. It remained as a monument at Beauvechain until it was acquired by the Historic Aircraft Collection in 1990 for restoration. Restored by Historic Flying Limited in 2002 and was registered as G-BSKP. In 2007 it was exported to the United States where it received the registration N201TB. It was cancelled in 2019 and exported to the UK and re-registered as G-BSKP, before flying again on 9 June 2020 at Sywell. The aircraft is now back at Duxford with the Aircraft Restoration Company (ARCo).
- Spitfire LF Mk.XVIe RW382 (G-PBIX). RW382 was built at Castle Bromwich in 1945 as a low-back Mk.XVI and was delivered to No. 604 Squadron in 1947 before being retired in 1953. After starring in the Battle of Britain movie and being a gate guard at various RAF stations, it was rebuilt to fly in 1991 in original 604 Squadron markings as NG-C and registered G-XVIA. It was exported to the United States in 1995 and registered as N382RW before it was lost in a fatal crash in 1998. The wreckage was later exported to the United Kingdom, rebuilt as a high-back Spitfire, re-registered as G-PBIX and flew again in 2013 in No. 322 (Dutch) Squadron markings of 3W-P. RW382 was repainted in 2020 as a Spitfire (WZ-RR) from 309th Fighter Squadron USAAF flown by Lieutenant Robert Conner in Italy 1944.
- Spitfire Mk.XVI TD248 (G-OXVI). Built in 1944 and entered service in 1945. It saw service with No.695 Squadron before being withdrawn from service in 1953. Displayed at Hooton Park, Cheshire before Historic Flying Ltd acquired the Spitfire and began restoration in 1988 for its first post-rebuild flight in 1992. the aircraft now wears the insignia of a No. 74 Squadron Spitfire XVI, but the codes are the initials of its pilot: Cliff Spink.

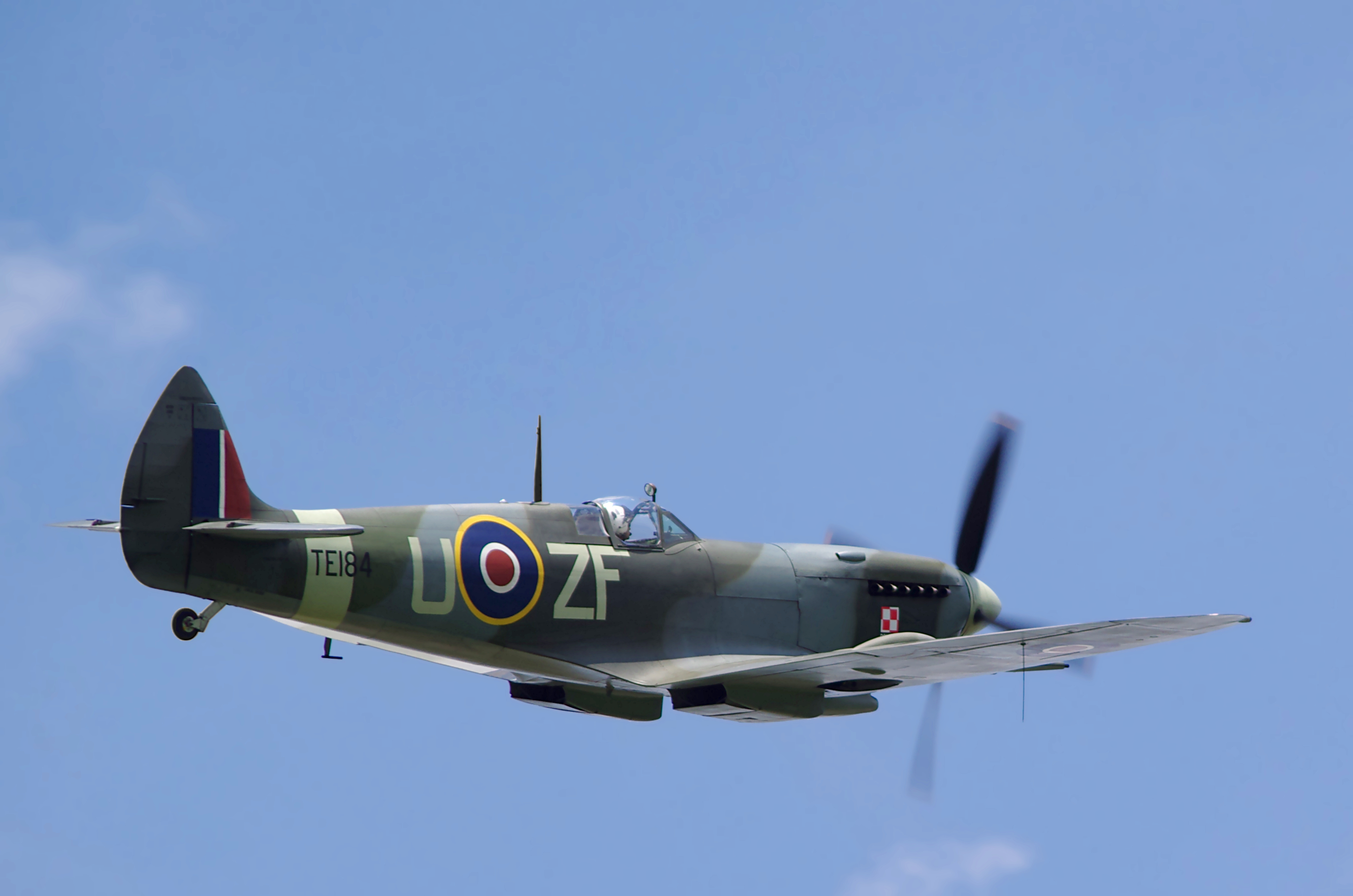
TE184 wearing the short-lived 308 Sqn markings at Kraków Air Show, 2014

- Spitfire LF Mk.XVIe TE184 (G-MXVI). Operated from the Biggin Hill Heritage Hangar, Biggin Hill, Kent. Since 2017, it has had the colours and markings of 9N-B to represent the Mk.XVI flown by Czechoslovak ace Flt Lt Otto Smik who was Squadron Commander of 127 Squadron when based at Grimbergen, Belgium, in November 1944. During June 2014 it was briefly marked as ZF-U of 308 (Polish) Squadron to replicate the mount of Jerzy Glowczewski, a veteran who had flown a similarly marked and coded Spitfire on 1 January 1945 when he claimed an FW-190 over Ghent, Belgium. The Air Picnic at the Polish Air Museum in Kraków on Saturday 28 June 2014 was attended by both TE184 in these special markings and also Jerzy Glowczewski, allowing him to be reunited with a machine in 'his' markings. TE184 was brought to Poland for this occasion by Jacek Mainka, the first Pole ever to fly a Spitfire into and in Poland. Jacek's late grandfather, Ryszard Kwiatkowski, was a mechanic with 303 and 308 Squadrons during the war and saw Glowczewski off in ZF-U for that mission.
- Spitfire LF Mk.XVIe TE311. The aircraft's Movement Card indicates it was awaiting allocation from Castle Bromwich on 8 June 1945 and at 39 MU eight days later. On 3 October the aircraft was allocated to the ECFS Handling Squadron at Hullavington for trials. In February 1946 it was transferred to 33, or possibly 39 MU and remained in storage until being allocated to 1689 FPT Flight at Aston Down on 31 May 1951. On 21 June it was involved in a landing accident while being piloted by F/Lt. RM Doig (South African), requiring on-site repair by Vickers Armstrong, returning to service on 13 December. In April 1953 the aircraft was allocated to the Ferry Training Unit at Benson, however by late September it was transferred back to storage with 33 MU. TE311's final operational use was a very brief allocation in January/February 1954 to 2 CAACU Langham, before returning to 33 MU. On 11 August 1955, the aircraft was sent to Tangmere for Gate Guardian duties until being loaned for participation in the Battle of Britain Film, with a mock wooden 'high back' and possibly restored to taxi condition. In 1971 it was thought to be back at Benson but on the gate, though at some point (possibly 1977) it was transferred to the RAF Exhibition Flight. In 2000 TE311 arrived at the BBMF alongside TB382 as spare parts airframes. In 2002, TE311 was determined to be in a good enough condition to be restored to fly, and had its first flight in 58 years in October 2012. Since May 2018, it flies with the markings SZ-G, markings once carried by TD240 of No. 316 Polish Fighter Squadron.
- Spitfire Mk.XIX PS853 (G-RRGN). Operated by Rolls-Royce Heritage Flight. Officially retired into ceremonial and display duties in 1957, PS853 was acquired by Rolls-‐Royce in 1996 after being operated for decades by the Battle of Britain Memorial Flight.
- Spitfire PR Mk.XIX PM631. Operated by the RAF Battle of Britain Memorial Flight at RAF Coningsby in Lincolnshire. Built as a high-altitude reconnaissance aircraft in November 1945. It currently wears the colours of a PR XIX from No 541 Squadron which performed photographic reconnaissance missions over Europe from early 1944 to the end of the war.
- Seafire LF Mk.IIIc PP972 (G-BUAR). Owned by Air Leasing Ltd. Built in 1944 and delivered to 809 Squadron Fleet Air Arm before joining the Aeronavale (French Navy) as 12F.2 (later 1F.9). It was purchased by a private individual in 1970 and was on static display in 1982 at the Resistance Museum at St Marcel. An airworthy restoration began in 1988 and was registered as G-BUAR. It was later acquired by Air Leasing in 2012 and was completed in 2015.
- Seafire F Mk.XVII SX336 (G-KASX). Owned by Tim J. Manna, Cranfield. Built by Westland Aircraft in 1946. Served with various units in the Royal Navy before it was scrapped in 1955. It was recovered in the 1970s as a bare fuselage and after a few owners, went to Tim Manna to finish the restoration. Took to the air for the first time since restoration in 2006. At some point after 2015, the aircraft was subject to an overhaul as part of a required major service for the Seafire. During this, the firewall was found to have been cracked (a known problem with Spitfires, and possibly caused or worsened by the 2011 gear-up landing) and had to be largely disassembled to check the structural integrity of the fuselage. The restoration was completed and the first flight was carried out on 18 November 2021.

Static display

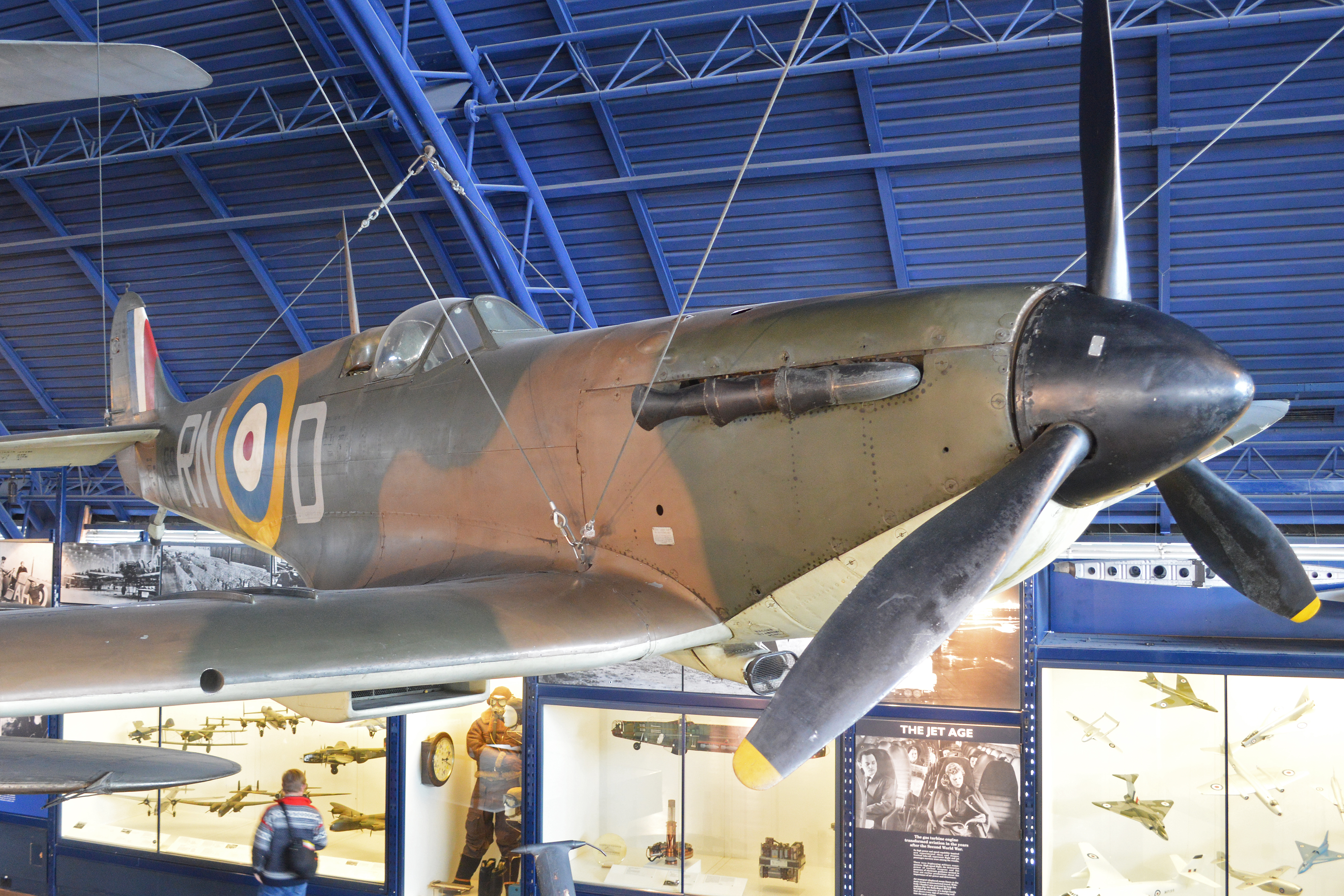
Mk.I P9444 on display in the Science Museum, London

- Spitfire F Mk.Ia K9942. On display at the Royal Air Force Museum, RAF Cosford wearing 72 (Basutoland) Squadron markings as K9942 / SD-D. The markings replicate the ones it wore whilst serving with 'A Flight', 72 Squadron in 1939. This is the oldest Spitfire still in existence, being the 155th Spitfire built.
- Spitfire F Mk.Ia P9444. On display at the Science Museum London wearing 72 (Basutoland) Squadron markings as RN-D with whom it served in 1940
- Spitfire F Mk.Ia R6915. On display at the Imperial War Museum, London. This aircraft flew during the Battle of Britain with 609 Squadron. Among the pilots who flew it were aces Noel Agazarian, who had two victories in this aircraft, and John Dundas, who scored one.
- Spitfire Mk.Ia X4590. On display as part of the Battle of Britain Experience at the Royal Air Force Museum, Hendon, in 609 Squadron markings as X4590 / PR-F. These are the markings it wore when serving with 'A Flight' 609 Squadron from RAF Middle Wallop, October 1940. It is credited with ½ share of Ju 88 whilst being flown by Pilot P/O S. J. Hill on 21 October 1940.
- Spitfire F Mk.IIA P7540. On display at the Dumfries and Galloway Aviation Museum at the former RAF Dumfries airfield. This aircraft was built at Castle Bromwich on 20 October 1940 and was first issued to 66 Squadron at Gravesend. Whilst being flown by Flying Officer Bobby Oxspring DFC** AFC, it was credited with shooting down a Messerschmitt Bf 109 during the Battle of Britain. On 25 October 1941, whilst being flown by Flying Officer Frantisek Hekl, 312 (Czech) Sqn from RAF Ayr, it crashed into Loch Doon. It was finally recovered from Loch Doon in 1982 and restored to static condition and finally revealed to the public in 2017.
- Spitfire F Mk.Vb BL614. On display at the Royal Air Force Museum, Hendon, in 222 (Natal) Squadron markings.
- Spitfire LF Mk.IXc ML427. On display at Thinktank, Birmingham Science Museum
- Spitfire LF Mk.XVIe RW388. On display at the Potteries Museum & Art Gallery, Hanley, Stoke-on-Trent. It was formally presented to the City of Stoke-on-Trent in 1972 and was built by the contractor Vickers Armstrong, in Castle Bromwich. It is fitted with a Merlin 266 (Packard) engine.
- Spitfire LF Mk.XVIe TB752. On display at the Hurricane and Spitfire Memorial Museum at the former RAF Manston in authentic Canadian 403 (Wolf) Squadron markings as KH-Z.
- Spitfire LF Mk.XVIe TE462. On display at the National Museum of Flight, Scotland.

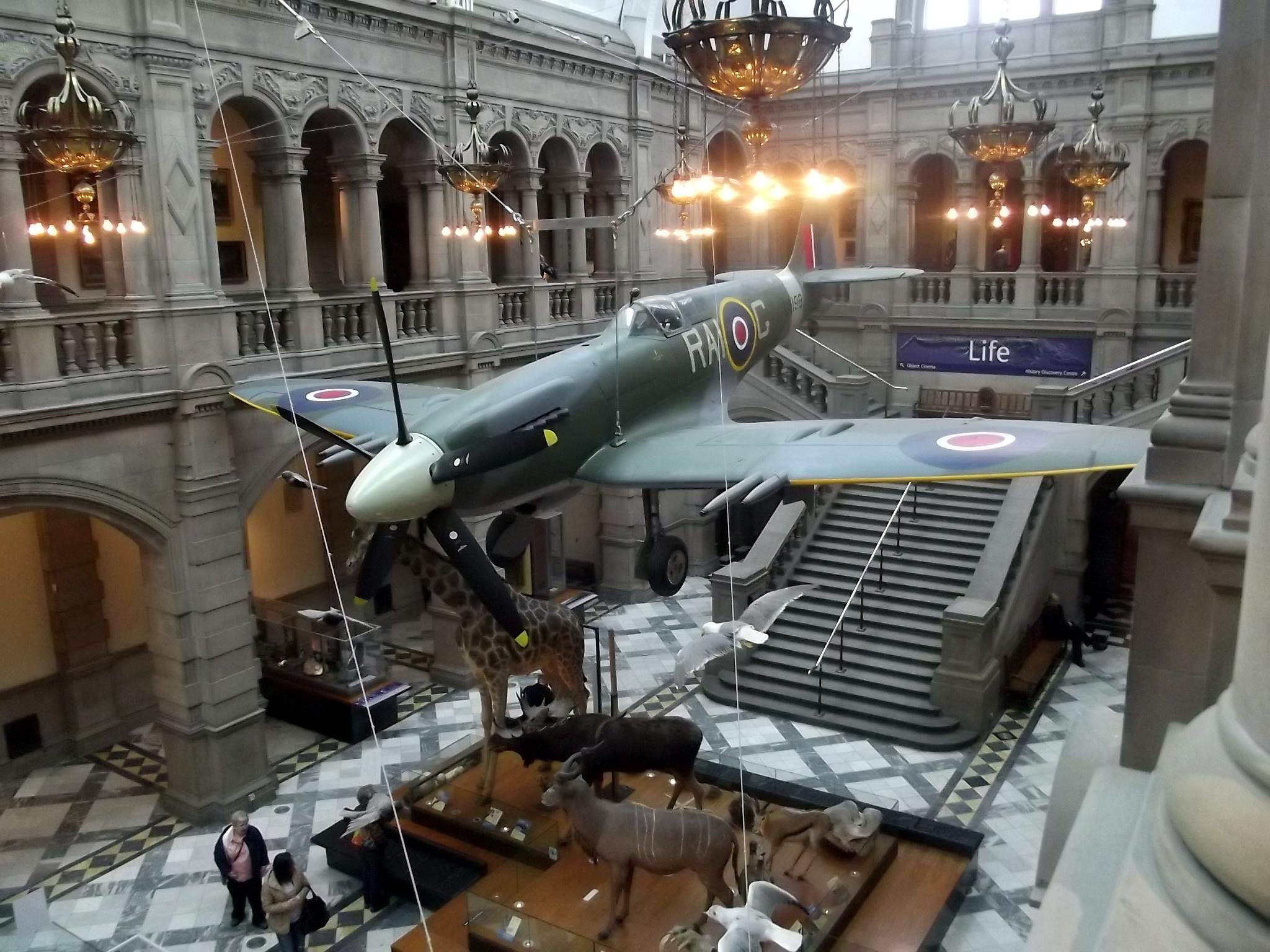
Spitfire F.21 LA198 with the animals at Kelvingrove Art Gallery and Museum, Glasgow

- Spitfire F Mk.21 LA198. Built in September 1944 at South Marston. Assigned to No 1 Sqn (RAF Manston). On 12 May 1947, allocated to 602 Sqn (City of Glasgow) Royal Auxiliary Air Force. Used in the Battle of Britain film. Aircraft is on display since the July 2006 reopening of Kelvingrove Art Gallery and Museum Glasgow.
- Spitfire F Mk.21 LA255. First flown in March 1945 and served 1 Squadron and 91 Squadron before it was withdrawn from service. 1 Squadron gained ownership of the aircraft as a museum piece and displayed at various air bases wherever the squadron is based, most recently at RAF Lossiemouth.
- Spitfire F Mk.24 PK683. On display at Solent Sky in Southampton.
- Spitfire F Mk.24 PK724. On display at the Royal Air Force Museum, Hendon.
- Spitfire F Mk.24 VN485. A former Hong Kong Auxiliary Air Force aircraft on display at the Imperial War Museum Duxford it wears an all-over silver scheme with a red/white spinner.
- Seafire F Mk.XVII SX137. On display at the Fleet Air Arm Museum, Yeovilton.

Restoration or stored

- Spitfire F Mk.Ia X4276 (G-CDGU). Under restoration to fly. Built in 1940 and delivered to 54 Squadron later that year and flown by F/Lt Al Deere with the codes KL-B and the name Kiwi III. It collided with X4650 in December 1940 (now airworthy in the UK) and subsequently struck off charge. The remains were recovered in 1987 and have been registered G-CDGU for an airworthy restoration.
- Spitfire F MK1 R6613 (G-RRST) Was flown by Squadron Leader Roland Robert Stanford Tuck with 92 Squadron. The aircraft shot down an ME110 on 11 September 1940 but later that same day was itself shot down. Pilot Ft. Lt. James Paterson bailed out successfully although he was injured. The wreckage had spent 30 years in a museum and 25 years in a private collection before being acquired by Greg Davis who registered it with the CAA on 5 November 2025. The aim is to restore the aircraft to flight.
- Spitfire F Mk.IIa P7819 (G-TCHZ). Under restoration to fly. It became part of 9 Maintenance Unit before joining 303 Squadron in 1941. It was shot down later that year which killed F/O Mierszwa. The remains were later recovered and acquired by Martin Phillips for an airworthy restoration.
- Spitfire F Mk.IIa P7913. Stored at Biggin Hill. This Spitfire was delivered with the name 'City of Birmingham' and served with No.66 Squadron and No.118 Squadron, where it was coded 'NK-H'. It would later be used by the Central Gunnery School when it crashed on 8 June 1943 while under the control of George Beurling, but he safely bailed out. The remains of the aircraft were retrieved and were at the Fenland and West Norfolk Aviation Museum before being moved to the Biggin Hill Heritage Hangar.
- Spitfire F Mk.IIa P8088 (G-CGRM). Call sign NKK, Borough of Lambeth. Owned by Mark Oliver Altrincham, Manchester, UK. Flown by Pilot Officer Alec Lumsden (UK) who adorned the aeroplane in Just Jake nose art and name Bette (rare for the RAF in 1941) Also flown by Pilot Officer Jens Gielstrup (Danish) Pre war novelist KIA and Flight Sergeant John Barry (Australia) KIFA
- Spitfire F Mk.IIb P8331 (G-KOSC). Under restoration to fly. Ordered as part of a consignment of 1000 Mk.II aircraft on 12 April 1939, P8331 was taken on charge from the Castle Bromwich Spitfire factory on 12 March 1941. Delivered to 12 MU on 4 April continuing on to 303 Sqn "Kosciuszko Squadron" based at RAF Northolt on 13 May. P8331 would fly some 52 combat missions with 303 Sqn in the little over six weeks it was operational. Of the 15 pilots who flew the aircraft, eight were Battle of Britain veterans, including Canadian Johnny Kent, and Polish flying legends Wojciech Kolaczkowski, Boleslaw Drobinski, Waclaw Lapkowski, Piotr Laguna and Wiktor Strzembosz. P8331 was being flown by Lapkowski on 4 June when it damaged an Bf 109 in combat over the English Channel between Dungeness and Cap Gris-Nez. On 17 June when being flown by Strzembosz it claimed a probable Bf 109 over Cap Gris-Nez again, and with the same pilot on 23 June had a confirmed Bf 109 kill Over North Desvres. Flown by Wing Commander Piotr Laguna leading the Northolt wing on a fighter offensive sweep on the Luftwaffe base at Coquelles on 27 June 1941, P8331 was struck by ground fire and climbing for height Piotr was seen to bail out but was too low for his parachute to open. P8331 impacted the ground just west of the airfield and was to remain buried until 1986 when it was recovered by local archaeologists. The wreckage remained within the museum and with a small number of local collectors until 2018 when efforts were made to reunite all the wreckage recovered. In April 2020 the substantial remains consisting of propellers and hub, engine, forward fuselage including the majority of the cockpit and fuselage structure were accepted onto the UK CAA registry.
- Spitfire F Mk.IIb P8208 (G-RRFF). Under restoration to fly. Served with No.303 Squadron and a number of other units prior to being lost on 26 January 1943 in a collision with P8207 during gunnery practice over the River Severn. The Severnside Aviation Society recovered the wreckage between 1984 and 1993 from the mudflats, and was eventually acquired by Retro Track And Air for an airworthy restoration as G-RRFF.
- Spitfire PR.IV AA810 (G-PRID). Under restoration to fly by Spitfire AA810 Restoration Ltd who have contracted restoration oversight to Kennet Aviation Ltd at Old Warden in Bedfordshire. Ordered in July 1940 as a Mk.I fighter, this Spitfire was built at Vincents Garage in Reading in the summer of 1941. Test flown by Jeffrey Quill on 17 October 1941 it was delivered to 1 PRU at RAF Benson on 19 October. Assigned to C Flight, it was stationed at RAF Mount Farm in Oxfordshire until deployment to RAF Wick in Scotland in January 1942 as part of the hunt for Tirpitz. Shot down by Heinz Knoke and Dieter Gerhardt on 5 March 1943, AA810 spent the next 76 years sitting on the side of a mountain near Surnadal in Norway. It was recovered in July 2018 and restoration began in March 2019. AA810's last pilot was Alastair Sandy Gunn who parachuted to safety and was captured. He was later one of the 76 officers who escaped from Stalag Luft III, he was caught and was of the 50 men executed on the orders of Adolf Hitler
- Spitfire F Mk.Vb AD540 (Blue Peter). On display at the Dumfries and Galloway Aviation Museum at the former RAF Dumfries airfield. This aircraft was paid for by funds raised by the people of Newmarket in 1941 and named after the winner of the 1939 Derby. During 1942, the aircraft was flying from RAF Ayr piloted by Pilot Officer David Gasphard Hunter Blair, RAFVR, tasked with providing air cover to the RMS Queen Mary troopship. During this mission, it was then tasked to intercept enemy aircraft inland. For some reason, the pilot was forced to bail out from the aircraft, which subsequently crashed near Cairnsmore of Carspahairn. The pilot was killed when his parachute failed to open. The aircraft was recovered by the Dumfries and Galloway Aviation Museum with help from a Royal Navy Sea King from HMS Gannet, on 12 July 1993 and featured on an episode of the TV show Blue Peter. Wreckage and Rolls-Royce Merlin engine currently on display to the public in unrestored condition.
- Spitfire PR Mk. IV BP926 (G-PRIV). First flown on 2 April 1942 and delivered to the Soviet Air Force on 3 September 1944, before it was shot down by a Bf-109G on 18 June 1944. The wreckage was recovered at some point and is currently registered G-PRIV to Peter Arnold for an airworthy restoration
- Spitfire LF Mk. Vb AD189 (G-CHVJ). Built by Castle Bromwich and delivered to No. 602 Squadron RAF in 1941. It ran out of fuel on a sortie and crashed in Crewkerne, Somerset when it was subsequently abandoned and struck off charge in 1942. The wreckage was excavated and registered to George Farrant as G-CHJV in 2013 to fly.
- Spitfire F Mk.Vb BL688 (G-CJWO). Currently being restored to flight by Parnall Aircraft Company. The aircraft flew Forward Air Control over the beaches of Normandy during D-Day and remained active supporting ground troops and naval bombardment.
- Spitfire F Mk. Vb BM539 (G-SSVB). Built and delivered to No. 242 Squadron RAF in June 1942, later serving with No. 610 Squadron RAF in 1943, No. 485 Squadron RNZAF and No. 19 Squadron RAF before being lost in a collision with BM323 on 9 July 1943. The wreckage was recovered in 2007 and initially registered as G-CGBI to Robert Cole. Since April 2020, it was registered as G-SSVB to Thomas Gilbert to restore it to airworthy condition.
- Spitfire F Mk.Vc EE606. In storage with Warbirds of Great Britain. Delivered to the RAAF as A58-106 in 1942 and struck off charge in 1948. Was brought back to the UK in the 1980s and registered G-MKVC to Charles Church of Spitfires Ltd. It flew in November 1988 but sadly crashed seven months later with the loss of Charles Church in July 1989. The CAA classified the aircraft as destroyed with the registry cancelled, but the wreckage was sold to Doug Arnold of Warbirds of Great Britain in 1990.
- Spitfire F Mk.Vc EF545 (G-CDGY). Owned by Aero Vintage Ltd, Duxford. It was delivered to the RAAF in 1943 as A58-149 and assigned to 79 Squadron with the code UP-O. EF545 flew in the RAAF until it was written off in 1944 after two landing accidents and a ground fire following a short circuit during an engine run. The remains were recovered in 1973 for (an incomplete) restoration which occurred in Australia, New Zealand and the UK. Some parts from this airframe were used to restore JG891, but EF545 is registered individually on the UK Civil Aviation Authority.
- Spitfire HF Mk. Vc LZ844. Owned by Martin Cobb. Built in 1943 and delivered to the RAAF as A58-213 that year, allotted to No. 79 Squadron RAAF with the codes UP-X. It got wrecked in a landing accident in December of that year and written off. The airframe was recovered in 1977 and restored to almost stock condition in 1996 (the four-bladed propeller (and possibly the engine also) came from a Fairey Barracuda) in the markings of R6915 coded PR-U, later repainted as LZ844, coded UP-X. It was sold to Martin Cobb alongside TE566 in 2011, being stored at Cotswold Airport.
- Spitfire LF Mk.VIII JF872 (G-RAAF). Delivered to the RAAF as A58-328 and was struck off charge in 1948.
- Spitfire F Mk.VIII JG668 (G-CFGA). Delivered to the RAAF as A58-441 and was struck off charge in 1948. Registered as G-CFGA to The Pembrokeshire Spitfire Aeroplane Company
- Spitfire Tr.9 BS548. Owned by Vintage Fighter Restorations. Built as a Mk.IXb and flew in various squadrons including No. 341 Squadron RAF, with which it was flying when in was shot down in 1943. The remains were unearthed in 2012 and is being rebuilt as a two-seater. Currently, the wings are with Vintage Fighter Restorations in Scone, New South Wales, while the fuselage is being restored in the UK by the Aircraft Restoration Company (ARCo), and will fly with Vintage Fighter Restorations in Australia.
- Spitfire F Mk.IX EN179 (G-TCHO). Under restoration to fly. Built and first flown in 1942 before joining No. 315 Polish Fighter Squadron. It later served with No. 306 Polish Fighter Squadron and No. 316 Polish Fighter Squadron as SZ-J (other codes listed but only one with photographic evidence) before being shot down on 19 August 1943, killing the pilot: F/O Andrzej Prochnicki. The wreckage was recovered in 2005 and registered to Martin Phillips as G-TCHO.
- Spitfire HF Mk.IXe MA764 (G-MCDB). Under restoration to fly. Built at Castle Bromwich in 1943 and delivered to No. 122 Squadron RAF (squadron code MT) in August 1943. The aircraft was shot down on 25 November 1943 over France by multiple Bf 109s. The wreckage was unearthed in 2005 and registered as G-MCDB to Mark Collenette in 2008 to be restored, but then acquired by the MSO Air and Space Museum in Turkey for an airworthy restoration at Biggin Hill, to join their museum.
- Spitfire LF Mk.IX MJ306. Under restoration to fly. Flew in the RAF with No.412 RCAF Squadron, coded 'VZ-K' and later 'VZ-M' with the name 'HOT-BOX', flown by Flight Lieutenant Andrew Boyd Ketterson. The Spitfire crashed on 4 March 1944 in Belgium, with the loss of Ketterson. The wreckage of the aircraft was later recovered and is owned by Alex Monk at the Biggin Hill Heritage Hangar as part of a restoration to airworthiness.
- Spitfire Tr.9 MJ627 (G-BMSB). Serve with 441 Squadron, Royal Canadian Air Force, coded 9G-Q. Sold in 1950 to Vickers for conversion into a two-seat trainer, carried Class B markings G-15-171. To Irish Air Corps in June 1951 as IAC 158; ground instruction airframe from April 1960. Sold to Tim Davies in February 1964, registered G-ASOZ. Sold to Maurice Bayliss in September 1976, re-registered G-BMSB. Restored to airworthy condition and flew again on 8 November 1993 marked 9G-Q. As of October 2016 owned by Warbird Experiences Ltd, based at Biggin Hill airfield. In May 2025 the Spitfire made an emergency landing in a field in Hythe, Kent after losing power, with damage sustained to the propeller and underside of the aircraft.
- Spitfire LF Mk.IXe MK356. Operated by the RAF Battle of Britain Memorial Flight at RAF Coningsby in Lincolnshire. Built at Castle Bromwich and delivered to RAF Digby in 1944. On 25 May 2024, this aircraft crashed in a field to the east of RAF Coningsby and was severely damaged. The pilot, Squadron Leader Mark Long, died in the crash.
- Spitfire LF Mk.IXe ML119 (G-SDNI). Delivered to No. 1 Squadron RAF in April 1944 and in December 1946, was delivered to the Czech Air Force as A-719. ML119 also flew with the IDFAF as 20-20 in 1948 and with the Burmese Air Force as UB441 in 1955. By 1965, it was a retired aircraft and was a gate guardian in Burma in various places until 1998, when it left Burma for the United States. After a couple of changes in owners, it was registered as G-SDNI in 2009 for an airworthy restoration.
- Spitfire LF Mk.IXc ML411. Delivered to Turkey in 1947 after serving with many squadrons in the RAF. It was recovered at some point and registered G-CBNU, but cancelled later on.
- Spitfire LF Mk.IXE NH238. Built in 1944 and served with the Dutch Air Force as H-60 and later H-103. Transferred to the Belgian Air Force as SM-36 in 1953. It was registered there as OO-ARE in 1956 for target tug use and registered N238V in 1969 when it was sold to the United States. NH238 was brought back to the UK and registered as G-MKIX in 1983. Flew as a warbird until its permit to fly expired in 1993, with the registration cancelled in 2002 and remaining in storage ever since.
- Spitfire LF Mk.IX PL258 (G-NSFS). Initially, with 39 Maintenance Unit, it was delivered to No.331 (Norwegian) squadron in 1944 and was involved in a mid-air collision with another Spitfire and belly-landed in the Netherlands. The remains were recovered in February 2018 and it is being restored to fly by the Aircraft Restoration Company (ARCo) at Duxford. The Spitfire will be based in Norway with the Norwegian Spitfire Foundation once the restoration is completed, along with a Norwegian civil register.
- Spitfire Mk.IX PT989 (G-CWIX). This Spitfire LF IX was built at Castle Bromwich Aircraft Factory in 1944. It was supplied with a Merlin 66 engine. On 31 August 1944, it was transferred to 33 Maintenance Unit and then on 8 September 1944 it was moved to 52 Maintenance Unit. On 24 September 1944, it was loaded onboard merchant ship S256. On 13 October 1944 it departed, as part of convoy JW.61 headed for Hapmat (a code word for the USSR). Arrived on 30 October at Hapmat. 1 November 1944 it was delivered to No.767 Fighter Aviation Regiment of the Murmansk Air Defence Force. It crashed following a mid-air collision with Spitfire PT879 on a training exercise on 18 May 1945. In September 2014 it was rediscovered by aviation archaeologists in Murmansk. Imported to the UK and registered with the CAA in 2022 as G-CWIX by Greg Davis who was the first owner as well as founder of "The Two-Seat Spitfire Page". In June 2025 PT989 was sold to Matt Jones of Spitfires.com. Matt intends to build her as a single seat MkIX.
- Spitfire F Mk.IXe RK858 (G-CGJE). This Spitfire was built in 1943 and in 1944 was delivered to the Soviet Air Force. No details about its service in Russia exist, apart from the fact that it was shot down at some point and was recovered in 1992 in a wrecked, but intact state. RK858 was registered as G-JGCA to be restored to flight at Duxford.
- Spitfire F Mk.IX RK912 (G-CLCS). Built and delivered to Casablanca in 1944 and bounced around Africa until 1945 when it was hit by flak and went down in Italy. In 2010 the remains were recovered and shipped to Duxford, where it was registered G-CLGS and will undergo an airworthy restoration.
- Spitfire LF Mk. IX SM639 (G-CKYM). Built by Castle Bromwich in 1944 and delivered to the Soviet Air Force in February 1945. It crashed in Russia at some point during service and the wreckage was recovered in 1994. Passing through various owners, it got a civilian registration of G-CKYM to Mark Bennet in 2019.

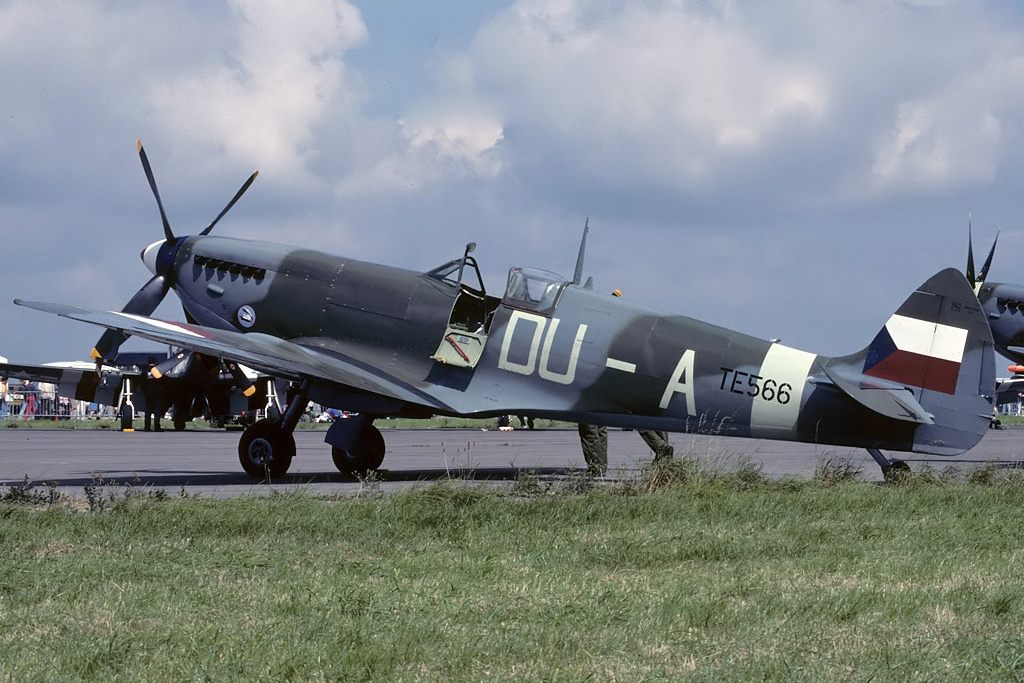
TE566 in the UK before the RAF markings were applied

- Spitfire Tr.9 MH367 (G-MHIX). Originally constructed in 1943 as a Spitfire Mk.IX. Was assigned to Royal Air Force. In July 1948 MH367 was damaged in a landing accident and struck of charge from the RAF. Its remains were discovered in the 1990s and incorporated into a two-seater project in Florida, USA. It was painted into USAAF desert colours with the markings of WD-Q, a Spitfire Mk Vb ER570 flown by Major Robert Levine. Its first post restoration flight was in November 2006. In 2008 MH367 was sold to notable New Zealand aerobatic pilot Doug Brooker and arrived in New Zealand on 11 September 2008. It was repainted into RAF desert colours with the markings of FL-A, a Mk IX EN520 flown by the New Zealand Squadron Leader Colin Gray, C/O of 81 Squadron when based in Tunisia in mid-1943.[95] In 2024 MH367 was sold to Ultimate Warbird Flights and shipped to Sywell in the United Kingdom. As of May 2026 it is currently under restoration.
- Spitfire Tr.9 TE566. Owned by Martin Cobb. It was built in early 1945 and was delivered No. 312 (Czechoslovak) Squadron RAF with the codes DU-A. After the war ended, the squadron was transferred to the Czech Air Force and TE566 went with the squadron. It joined the Israeli Air Force in 1949 as 20-32 until retired in 1956. It was recovered by Guy Black of Aero Vintage alongside MJ730 (now with Jerry Yagen in Virginia Beach) with the register G-BLCK. It was rebuilt as a standard LF Mk. IX in 1992 in Czech markings and insignia. The markings were modified in 1994 with RAF insignia and D-Day stripes (the codes and other markings remained) and flew in the UK by Historic Aircraft Collection until sold to Andrew Torr of South Africa in 1998 with the register ZU-SPT. Mike Snoyman acquired the plane in January 2002, only for it to crash four months later at its base at Wonderboom Airport with the loss of Mike Snoyman. The wreck was sold by insurance to Aviation Australia in Brisbane, to be rebuilt as a two-seater with the registration of VH-IXT. It was acquired by Martin Cobb in 2011 alongside LZ844 and is stored at Cotswold Airport.
- Spitfire F Mk.XII EN224 (G-FXII). Under restoration to airworthy condition at RAF Bentwaters in Suffolk. Previously stated that would be complete by June 2012.
- Spitfire F Mk.XIVc RM689 (G-ALGT). In storage at East Midlands with Rolls-Royce. Delivered to 350th Squadron in 1945 as MN-E and later acquired by Rolls-Royce in 1949 and refurbished to fly with the registration G-ALGT. It flew in the Battle of Britain movie with period-accurate markings before returning to Rolls-Royce. It was painted in the markings of RM619, AP-D of No. 130 Squadron before being repainted in original markings of MN-E of 350th Squadron. The Spitfire crashed during an airshow at Woodford Aerodrome in 1992 with the loss of the pilot and the civil registration cancelled by the CAA. Ten years later, the registration G-ALGT was reassigned to RM689 for a new-build restoration by Rolls-Royce Heritage Hangar before being moved to long-term storage in 2010.
- Spitfire F Mk. XIV RM694 (G-DBKL). Under restoration to fly. Built in October 1943 at Chattis Hill shadow factory with a Griffon 65, it was delivered to No. 91 Squadron RAF in July 1944. It would carry out 30 missions to intercept V-1 flying bombs, with a kill credited to Flying Officer Elcock while flying RM694 on 7 August 1944. The aircraft would be transferred to No.402 Squadron RCAF later on and wrecked in September 1944, being repaired back to service on 21 April 1945. The Central Fighter Establishment would be the last group to fly RM694, with the Spitfire grounded in November 1948, becoming an instructional airframe as 6640M. Over the decades, passing through several owners, the wings were used to rebuild NH904 in the 1960s with 2021 finally bringing the fuselage of RM694 to Biggin Hill Heritage Hangar to take to the skies, registered as G-DBKL.
- Spitfire LF Mk.XVIe SL611 (G-SAEA). This MK.XVI served with No. 603 Squadron RAF in 1947 before it was lost in a crash that year with the loss of Flt Lt Donald James Ott Loudon. The wreckage was recovered in 1997 and the aircraft has since 2005 undergone a long-term restoration to fly, getting the registration of G-SAEA in 2015.
- Spitfire LF Mk.XVIe TB382. Stored at Airframe Assemblies. Flew with No.602 Squadron in 1945 by Raymond Baxter with the codes 'LO-Z', named 'Sylvia'. After service in the Royal Air Force, it was put on display as a gate guardian at various RAF bases from 1955, including an appearance in the Battle of Britain movie, until 1977, when it was used as a travelling exhibit for the RAF. In 1999, it was sent to the Battle of Britain Memorial Flight at Coningsby alongside TE311 as a parts source for the flight. It would ultimately be sold to Airframe Assemblies on the Isle of Wight for its own restoration to flight.
- Spitfire LF Mk.XVIe TE356. Under restoration at Biggin Hill. It was built and delivered to the RAF in 1945 with No. 695 Squadron RAF with the codes 4M-M and 8Q-Z. After retirement, it would be used as an instructional airframe before it would join the Battle of Britain movie as a taxiable airframe, where it would make an unplanned "hop" into the sky during a fast taxi. Various attempts after the film to get the Spitfire in airworthy condition failed, but a restoration finally occurred in the late 1980s and made its first post-rebuild flight on 16 December 1987 as G-SXVI. In 1990 the aircraft joined the Evergreen Aircraft Collection in Oregon with the registration N356EV, later N356TE. TE356 suffered an undercarriage collapse on landing in 1996 but was later repaired. After it left the Evergreen collection, the aircraft went "into hiding" for a while, but TE356 went to Biggin Hill in 2019 to be restored.

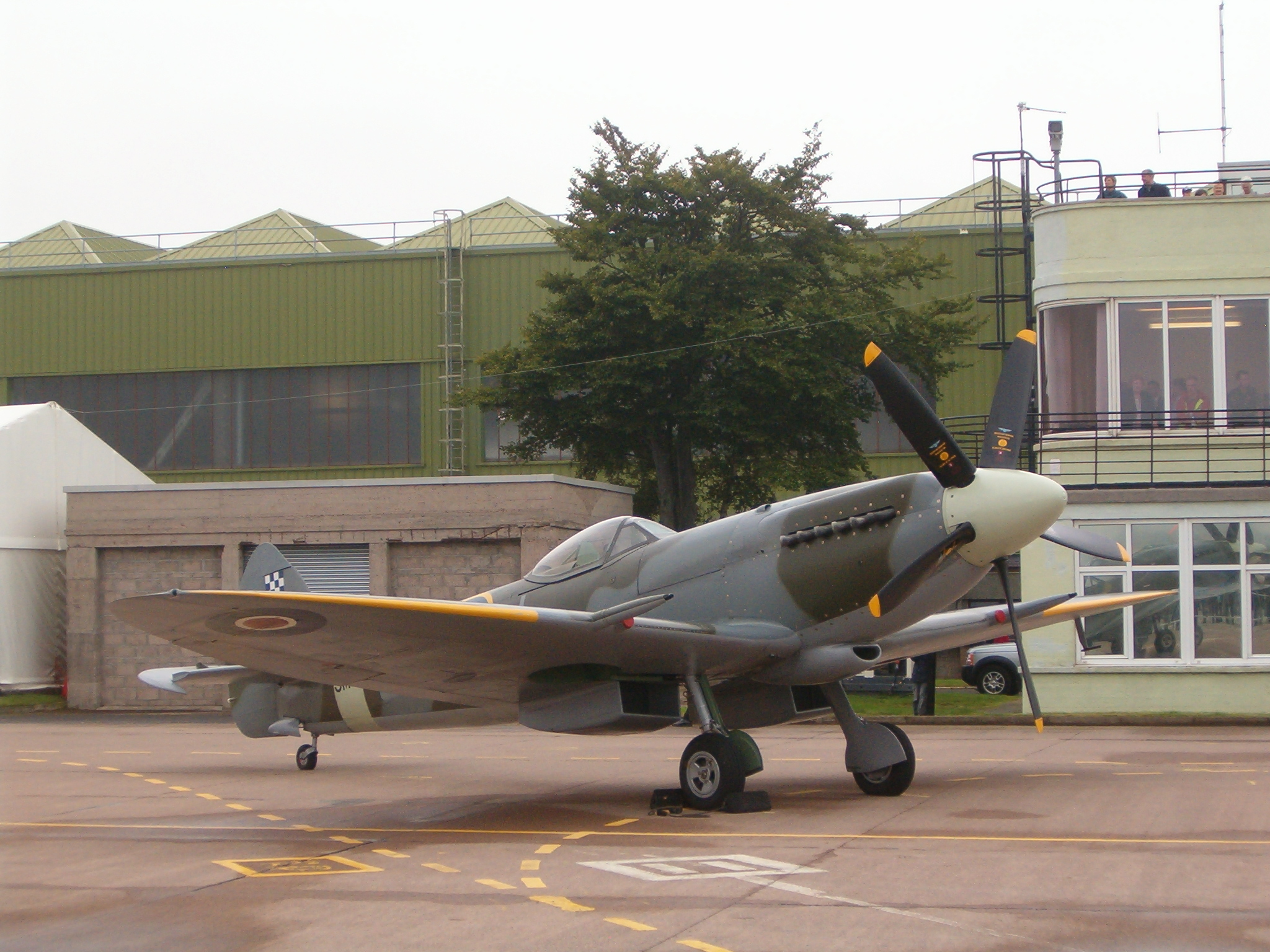
Spitfire FR Mk.XVIIIe SM845 at RAF Leuchars Airshow, 2008

- Spitfire FR Mk.XVIIIe SM845 (G-BUOS). Based in Germany with MeierMotors. This Spitfire was built in May 1945 and delivered to Karachi as part of the South East Asia Command. In the 1970s, it was brought back to the UK for an airworthy restoration with Historic Flying Limited. After it was rebuilt in 2000, it was a prominent warbird in the UK before it was sold to Sweden and registered as SE-BIN, and sadly suffered a fatal accident on 21 August 2010 while landing in Norway. It was imported from Sweden in 2012 to the UK following this, and it flew once again at Duxford on 17 December 2013 as G-BUOS, owned by Spitfire Ltd and operated from both Duxford and Humberside. It wears the markings of post-war (July 1950) 28 Squadron based in Hong Kong of overall silver with a red spinner and coded SM845 / -R. SM845 was flown to its new home in Germany with Meier Motors in December 2020 as D-FIII. SM845 was badly damaged in an accident on 26 May 2023, while landing at Hildesheim Airfield. SM845 was shipped to the UK in 2024 to be repaired.
- Spitfire F Mk. XVIII TZ219. Under restoration in the UK to fly. Delivered to the Indian Air Force in 1947 as HS683 and was retired in 1962 and became an instructional airframe. It was brought into the ownership of the Indian Air Force Museum in 2019. The plan was for it to be on static display, but an airworthy restoration was possible. The aircraft ended up being sent to Air Leasing at Sywell, who will restore this aircraft back to airworthiness before being returned to India for their Indian Air Force Historic Flight.
- Spitfire PR Mk.XIX PS915. Under major refurbishment at Duxford by the Aircraft Restoration Company. Operated by the RAF Battle of Britain Memorial Flight at RAF Coningsby in Lincolnshire. Entered service too late for the war, joining No.541 Squadron at RAF Benson in June 1945. Before entering refurbishment it wore the colours and markings of PS888, a PRXIX of 81 Squadron based at Seletar in Singapore during the Malaya Campaign. This aircraft conducted the last ever operational sortie by an RAF Spitfire when, on 1 April 1954, it flew a photographic mission over an area of jungle in Johore thought to contain hideouts for Communist guerrillas. For the occasion, the aircraft's ground crew painted the inscription 'The Last!’ on the left engine cowling
- Spitfire F Mk.22 PK519 (G-SPXX). Under amateur restoration by Peter Arnold in the UK. Delivered to No. 615 Squadron in 1949 and lost in a collision with PK518. The wreckage was recovered in 2001 and Peter Arnold acquired it in 2012 for an airworthy restoration.
- Spitfire F Mk. 22 PK624. Under restoration to fly. After construction, the aircraft was sent to storage at 6 MU for a number of years, before finally being delivered to 614 Squadron as RAU-T on 25 August 1948. After two years, the aircraft went back to storage with 6 MU. PK624 was later sent to 9 MU and in 1951, was being prepped for sale to the Syrian Air Force, which didn't end up happening and was kept with the RAF until its retirement in 1953. In 1957, some members of 604 Squadron were looking after it and flying it (although not officially an RAF aircraft) which was the last time it would fly before going on gate guardian display at RAF Uxbridge, which for some reason was painted with the serial WP916, which is a de Havilland Chipmunk serial. This was fixed in 1963 and moved to RAF Station Northolt where it would stay for the next seven years. It was moved again in 1970 to RAF Abingdon where it was repainted in its 614 Squadron markings. This would be its last 'posting' before its value was recognised in 1989, and like all other gate guardian aircraft of that time, were brought down to protect them from further effects from the elements, which saw PK624 moved to RAF St Athan. The Fighter Collection negotiated with the MoD to get the Spitfire from them in 1994, who have been over time, cleaning up the aircraft and undergoing the required work to see the aircraft fly again.
- Spitfire F Mk. 22 PK664. Under restoration to fly. This aircraft was a gate guardian at several airbases until it was put into storage at the RAF Museum Reserve Collection in Stafford. The aircraft was sold to Kennet Aviation in exchange for a failed recovery attempt to retrieve a P-40E from Egypt. PK664 is now undergoing its own restoration, with the fuselage at Airframe Assemblies being rebuilt as of 2020.
- Seafire LF Mk.III RX168 (G-BWEM). Under restoration to airworthiness. Delivered to the Irish Air Corps as IAC 157 until becoming an instructional airframe in 1953. It was possibly broken up in the 1960s, but became a restoration project sometime after and registered G-BWEM in 1995.
- Seafire F Mk.XV SR462 (G-TGVP). Flew with the Burmese Air Force before being retired as a gate guard. It was recovered in the 1990s and was previously under restoration in Missouri before heading to the UK for restoration, registered G-TGVP, with the restoration happening at Kennet Aviation at Old Warden.
- Seafire F Mk.XVII SX300 (G-RIPH). Its military service is not well known, but it was recovered by Peter Arnold in 1973. It is now owned by Seafire Displays Ltd, Cayman Islands, but at Old Warden in the UK with Kennet Aviation for restoration.
- Seafire F Mk.46 LA546 (G-CFZJ). Recovered in 1971 by Peter Arnold at the same time as LA564 for restoration. It is now registered to Craig Charleston as G-CFZJ.
- Seafire F Mk.46 LA564 (G-FRSX). Recovered in 1971 by Peter Arnold at the same time as LA546 for restoration. It is now owned by Seafire Displays Ltd, Cayman Islands, but at Old Warden for restoration to fly. In 2020, the fuselage was being prepared to be sent to Airframe Assemblies on the Isle of Wight to be rebuilt.

=== United States ===
Airworthy

- Spitfire F Mk.Ia P9374 (N92SQ). Owned by Walter Bowe at Ala Doble Flying Collection, Restored to airworthy condition by Historic Flying Limited, made its first post-restoration flight at Duxford on 9 September 2011, registered as G-MKIA. Previously owned by the Mark One Partnership LLC at Duxford Airfield. In July 2017 it was sold to a private owner in the United States with the register N92SQ. It wears the exact colours it wore flying with 92 Sqn from RAF Croydon when shot down on 24 May 1940, P9374 / -J, and it landed on the beach at Calais, France. It was flown by Flying Officer Peter Cazenove, who survived the crash and was taken prisoner by the Germans. He was held in Stalag Luft III and involved in the Great Escape.
- Spitfire F Mk.Vc AR614 (N614VC). Owned by the Flying Heritage and Combat Armor Museum in Everett, Washington. It was built in 1942 by Westland Aircraft and was delivered to 312 (Czech) Squadron. In 1945 it became an instructional airframe and remained that way until sold to a Canadian Museum in 1963. It became airworthy in the 1990s before joining FHCAM in 1999 in its 312 Squadron markings.

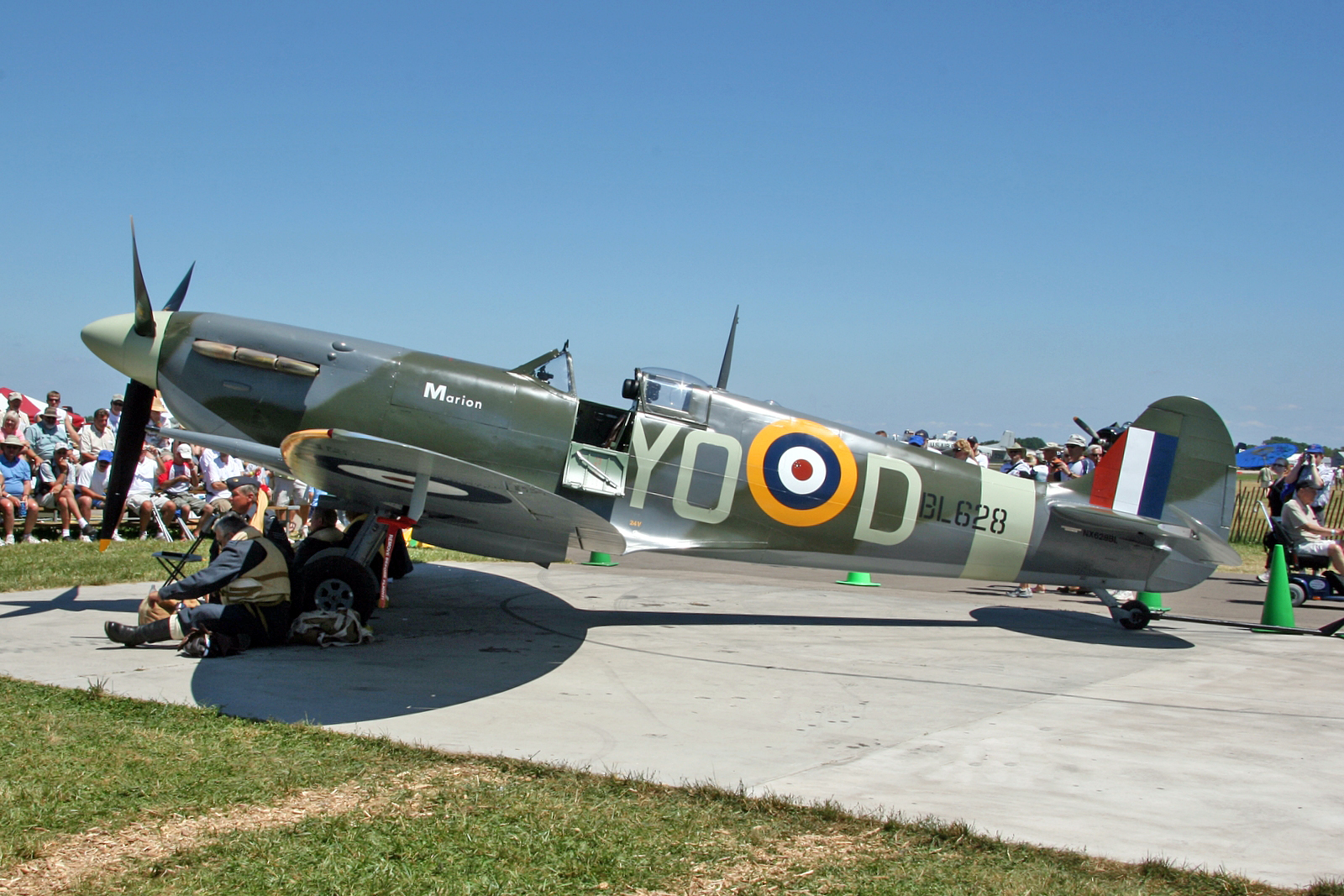
BL628 on display at Oshkosh 2008

- Spitfire F Mk.Vb BL628 (N628BL). Owned by Lewis Air Legends and based in Encinal, Texas. It wears the markings YO-D of 401 (RCAF) Squadron at RAF Gravesend, which it wore during 1942 as the personal aircraft of G. B. "Scotty" Murray. BL628 had the name Marion painted on the fuselage just forward of the cockpit after the pilot's girlfriend, and this detail has been faithfully replicated.
- Spitfire F Mk.Vb EP122 (N5TF). Owned by Comanche Fighters, Texas. This Spitfire was built in 1942 and saw service in Malta with 249 Squadron, 185 Squadron and 1435 Squadron. The aircraft crashed landed on 27 March 1943 on the cliffside of Dwejra Bay, Gozo and subsequently pushed over the cliff into the sea. The wreckage was recovered in the 1970s and flew in the UK with the civil register G-CISV. It starred in the 2017 film Dunkirk. The plane was exported to the United States in 2018 and registered N5TF.
- Spitfire F Mk.IX BR601 (N64SQ). Built in 1942 and delivered to No. 64 Squadron RAF that year as SH-F. Over its time with the RAF, BR601 also served with 453 Squadron as FU-S, 129 Squadron as DV-S, 316 Squadron as SZ-H before joining 165 Squadron in 1944. It survived the war and joined the SAAF with the serial 5631 (one number before RR232 as 5632, airworthy in the UK) in 1949. After SAAF service, it was used as a parts frame to restore MA793 (now in Brazil) before being "rebuilt" itself and on display at a scrapyard in 1976. 10 years later, the aircraft was removed from display and sold to the UK in storage, before becoming airworthy in the UK as G-CIYF, wearing its original 64 Squadron markings of SH-F. It was exported to the US later that year to join the Collings Foundation as N64SQ.
- Spitfire LF Mk.IXe MJ730 (N730MJ). Owned by Jerry Yagen and based at the Military Aviation Museum, Virginia Beach, Virginia. In April 1944 MJ730 was assigned to No. 417 Squadron RCAF, then operating in Italy. It flew 95 missions as an escort for American bombers over northern Italy. In June 1946, it was transferred to the Italian Air Force. In 1947, MJ730 was used in the film Thunderbolt!, directed by William Wyler. In 1951 it was sold to the Israeli Air Force, and after service ended up in an Israel playground. In the 1970s a collector transported it back to Britain for restoration. FedEx founder Fred Smith bought it in 1986.

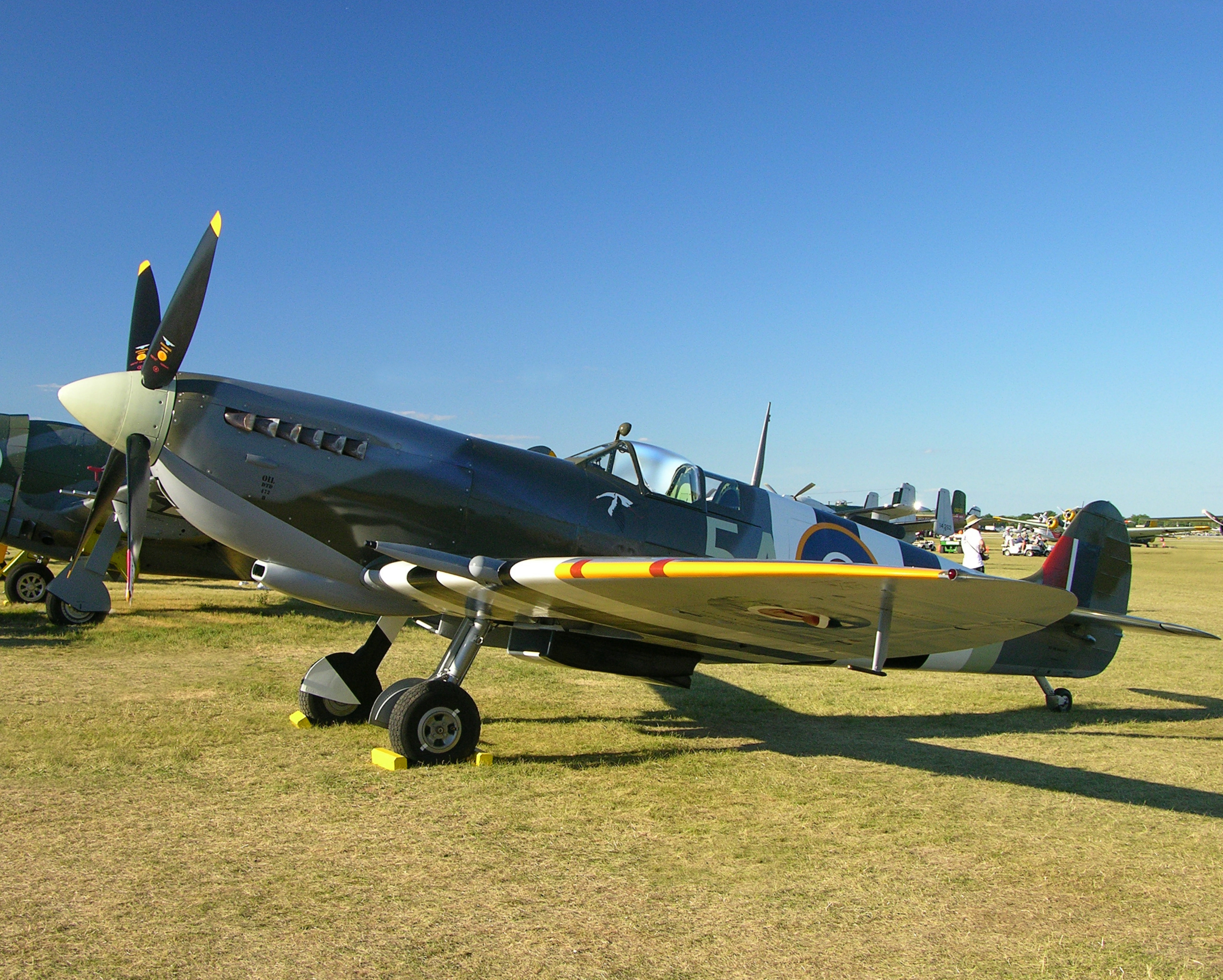
MK959 on display at Oshkosh 2005

- Spitfire LF Mk.IXc MK959 (N959RT). Owned by the Texas Flying Legends Museum.
- Spitfire FR Mk.XIVe NH749 (N749DP). Owned and operated by the Southern California Wing of the Commemorative Air Force, based at Camarillo Airport. Built in late 1944, NH749 was shipped to India in July 1945 to serve with the RAF's South East Asia Command (SEAC) squadrons. Rendered surplus to requirements by the Japanese surrender in August 1945 NH749 was placed in storage and sold to the Indian Air Force in late 1947. In 1978 it was rediscovered and transported to England by the Hayden-Bailey brothers. After restoration to flying condition NH749 was sold to Keith Wickenden with the civil registration G-MXIV. NH749 was later sold to David Price's Museum of Flying in the United States and was operated from 1985 to 2005 when it was once again sold, this time to the CAF. It wears a SEAC colour scheme with the markings -L.
- Spitfire F Mk.XIVe SM832 (N54SF). Built in 1945 and served with the Indian Air Force. It was brought back to the UK and restored to flight in 1995 as G-WWII before going to France as F-AZSJ. In 2002 it was brought back to the UK as G-WWII. It was acquired in 2004 by Planes of Fame in Chino, California as N54SF. Currently registered to Comanche Fighters in Texas.
- Spitfire FR MK.XVIe TB252 (N752TB). Delivered to No. 329 Squadron RAF on 1 March 1945 and No. 341 Squadron RAF on the 15th of that month. It later served with No.350 Squadron of the Belgian Air Force in 1946 before it became a gate guardian in 1955. It remained as a monument until 1988 when it was acquired by Historic Flying, before undergoing restoration to fly by Avpsecs in Ardmore, New Zealand. The aircraft made its first post-rebuild flight on 18 December 2020 as ZK-NLJ.
- Spitfire LF Mk.XVIe TE392 (N14TS). Owned by Condor LLc in Florida, United States. Was a gate guard at a number of RAF airfields, including RAF Kemble and RAF Hereford, between 1952 and 1984. Originally built as a low-back airframe with a 'bubble' canopy, it was restored into a high-back configuration and flew again in Florida on 24 December 1999 with the FAA register N97RW. It was owned by the Lone Star Flight Museum (LSFM) in Galveston, Texas and was in storage following damage sustained during Hurricane Ike. It wore the markings and colours ZX-Z to represent the aircraft of Sqn Ldr Lance C. Wade No. 145 Squadron RAF, a Texan who flew with the RAF from 1940 to 1944 and went on to become an ace. The FAA tail number was cancelled on 19 December 2018 and was sold to Bishopp Aviation Pty Ltd for Fighter Pilot Adventure Flights in Australia who restored the aircraft back to airworthy condition. It made its first post-restoration flight on 13 January 2020 registered as VH-XWE (then VH-RAF), and flew in their 'Fly with a Spitfire' event once a month. TE392 was exported back to the States in May 2022 and assigned with the registration N14TS.

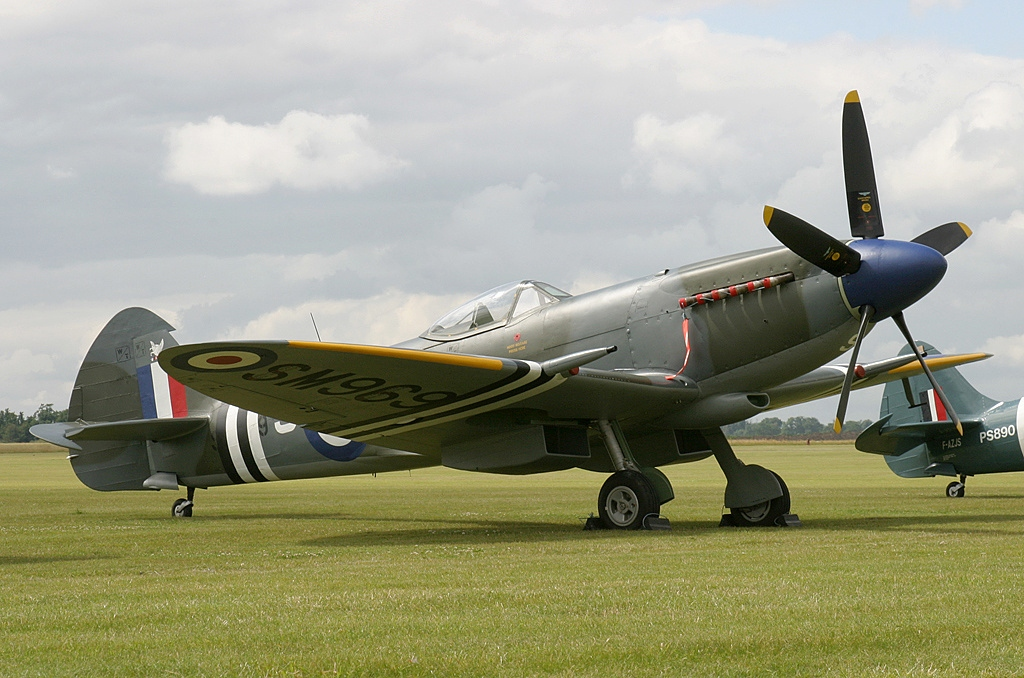
SM969 on static display at an airshow, Duxford UK

- Spitfire FR Mk.XVIIIe SM969 (N969SM). Built and delivered to the RAF before being delivered to the Indian Air Force with the tail number HS877. It was brought back to the UK in 1978 with the restoration beginning in 2006. The aircraft became airworthy again in 2008 with the register G-BRAF. Later that year it was sent to the USA being registered N969SM.

Static display

- Spitfire F Mk.Ia P9306. On display at the Museum of Science and Industry in Chicago. It is a Battle of Britain veteran that flew with No. 74 Squadron RAF.

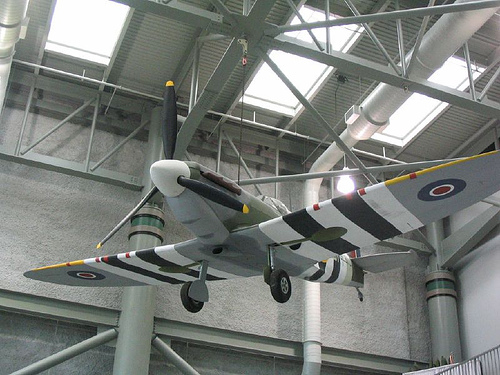
BL370 on display at the National World War II Museum, New Orleans

- Spitfire F Mk. Vb BL370. Was built and delivered to the RAF before crashing in 1944. It was recovered in the 1980s and rebuilt for display at the National World War II Museum.
- Spitfire F Mk.Vc MA863. On display at the National Museum of the United States Air Force, Wright-Patterson Air Force Base, near Dayton, Ohio. It wears representative Operation Torch markings as HL-B, 31st Fighter Group, 308th Fighter Squadron. Ex Royal Australian Air Force (RAAF) A58-246, it served with 54 Squadron (RAF) in early 1944 as the personal mount of Sqn Ldr E M Gibbs wearing the codes DL-A. Later served with No.452 Squadron (RAAF) coded QY-F.

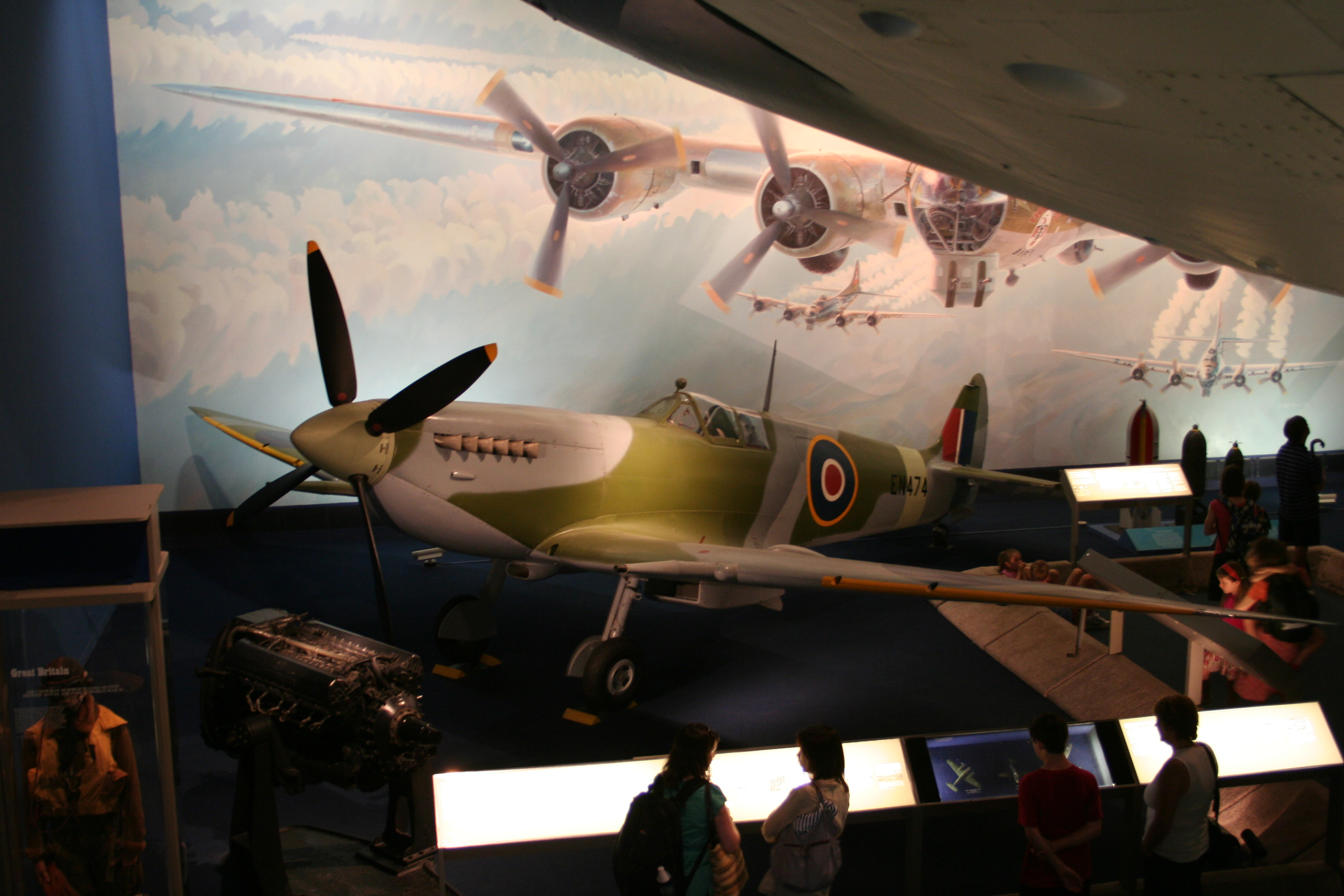
EN474 on display at the Smithsonian, Washington DC

- Spitfire HF Mk. VIIc EN474. It was built in 1943 for the RAF but later allocated to the USAAF for evaluation. Was retired to the National Air and Space Museum in 1947 and put on display in 1974, where it has been ever since.
- Spitfire LF Mk.VIIIc MT719 (N719MT). Airworthy with the Cavanaugh Flight Museum in Addison, Texas. This aircraft served with No. 17 Squadron (RAF) in both India and Burma during 1944/1945. It was transferred to the Royal Indian Air Force at the end of 1947 and served as an instructional airframe. Today it wears the markings and codes worn during its 17 Squadron service as YB-J. Removed from public display when the museum indefinitely closed on 1 January 2024. To be moved to North Texas Regional Airport in Denison, Texas.
- Spitfire LF Mk.IXc MK923 (N521R). On display at the Museum of Flight in Seattle, Washington following acquisition in 2000. This Spitfire was formerly owned by the late actor Cliff Robertson. From 1972 until 1994, it was flown by Jerry Billing, a Canadian Second World War Spitfire pilot, until he retired from flying Spitfires at age 75. Billing set a record for most Spitfire experience while flying this Spitfire (52 1/2 years). During Robertson's ownership and Billing's pilot tenure with MK923, the aircraft was mainly based in Windsor, Ontario, Canada. It wears the markings and codes it wore when serving with No. 126 Squadron at RAF Sawbridgeworth, Hertfordshire in mid to late 1944 as 5J-Z.
- Spitfire PR Mk.XI PA908. On display at the National Museum of the United States Air Force, Wright-Patterson Air Force Base, near Dayton, Ohio.
- Spitfire FR Mk.XIVe MT847. On display at the Pima Air and Space Museum in the USA.
- Seafire FR Mk.47 VP441 (N47SF). The final variant of the Spitfire family. Owned by Jim Smith and based at his private facility in Montana following restoration by Ezell Aviation.

Restoration or stored

- Spitfire LF Mk.XVIe TE476 (N476TE). Owned by Kermit Weeks and under refurbishment at his Fantasy of Flight facility, Polk City, Florida. It wears the markings and colours GE-D to represent TB900 the personal mount of Sqn Ldr Lallemand OC, 349 (Belgian) Squadron RAF in 1945–1946. The original aircraft, TB900, was a presentation Spitfire named "Winston Churchill" and the name is faithfully replicated on the Port side of the fuselage just below the cockpit along with the tally of aircraft kills and tank victories.

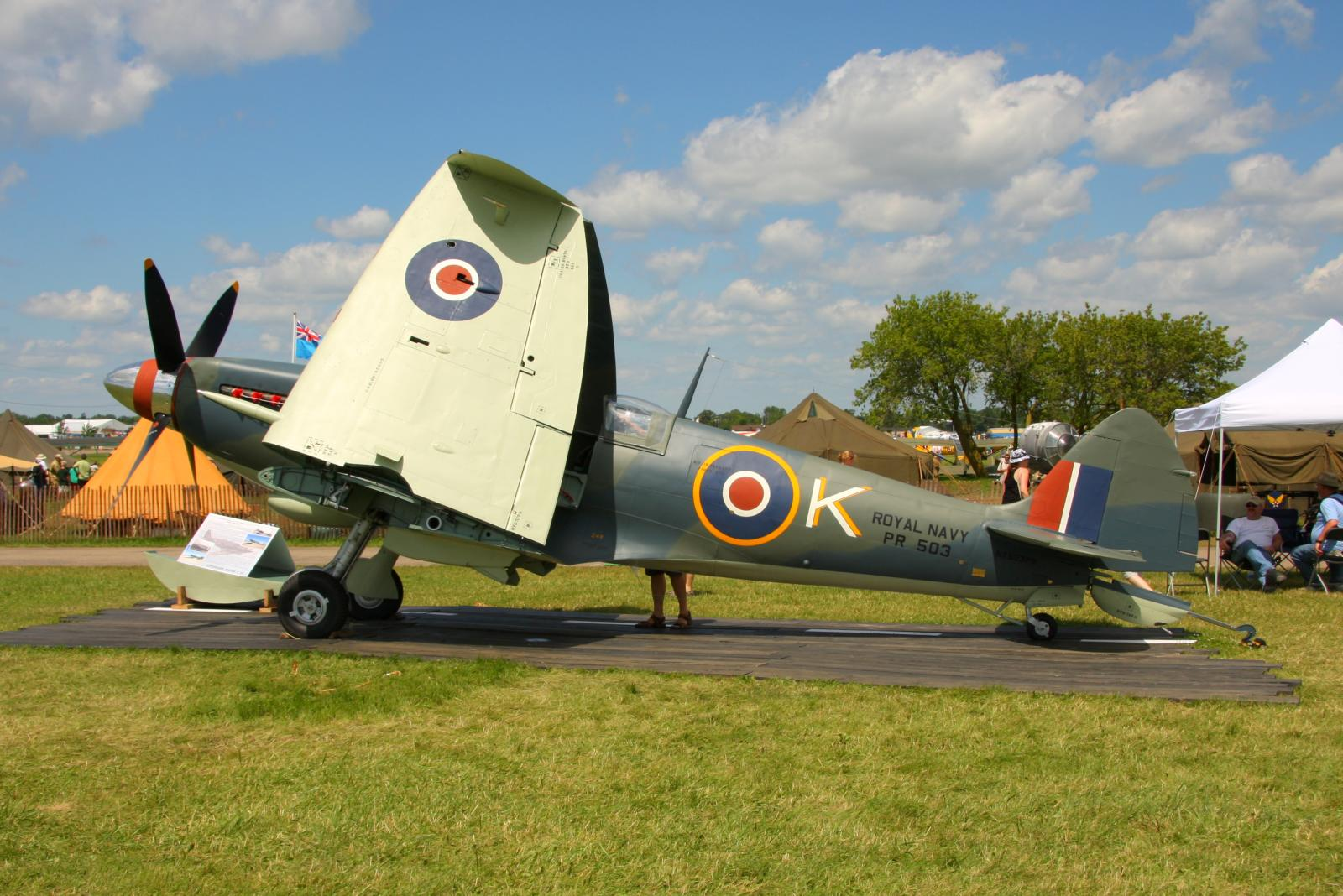
PR503 on display at Oshkosh Air Show, 2010

- Seafire F Mk.XV PR503 (N503PR). Like all Seafire Mk.XVs, this aircraft was built too late for the war but served in the Royal Navy and Canadian Navy post-war. It sat in outdoor storage for many years and passed through many hands before being sold to the Canadian Warplane Heritage Museum until 1993. At some point, it was acquired by Jim Cooper who restored it to airworthy condition in 2010, resplendent with its original Royal Navy colour scheme.

=== Zimbabwe ===
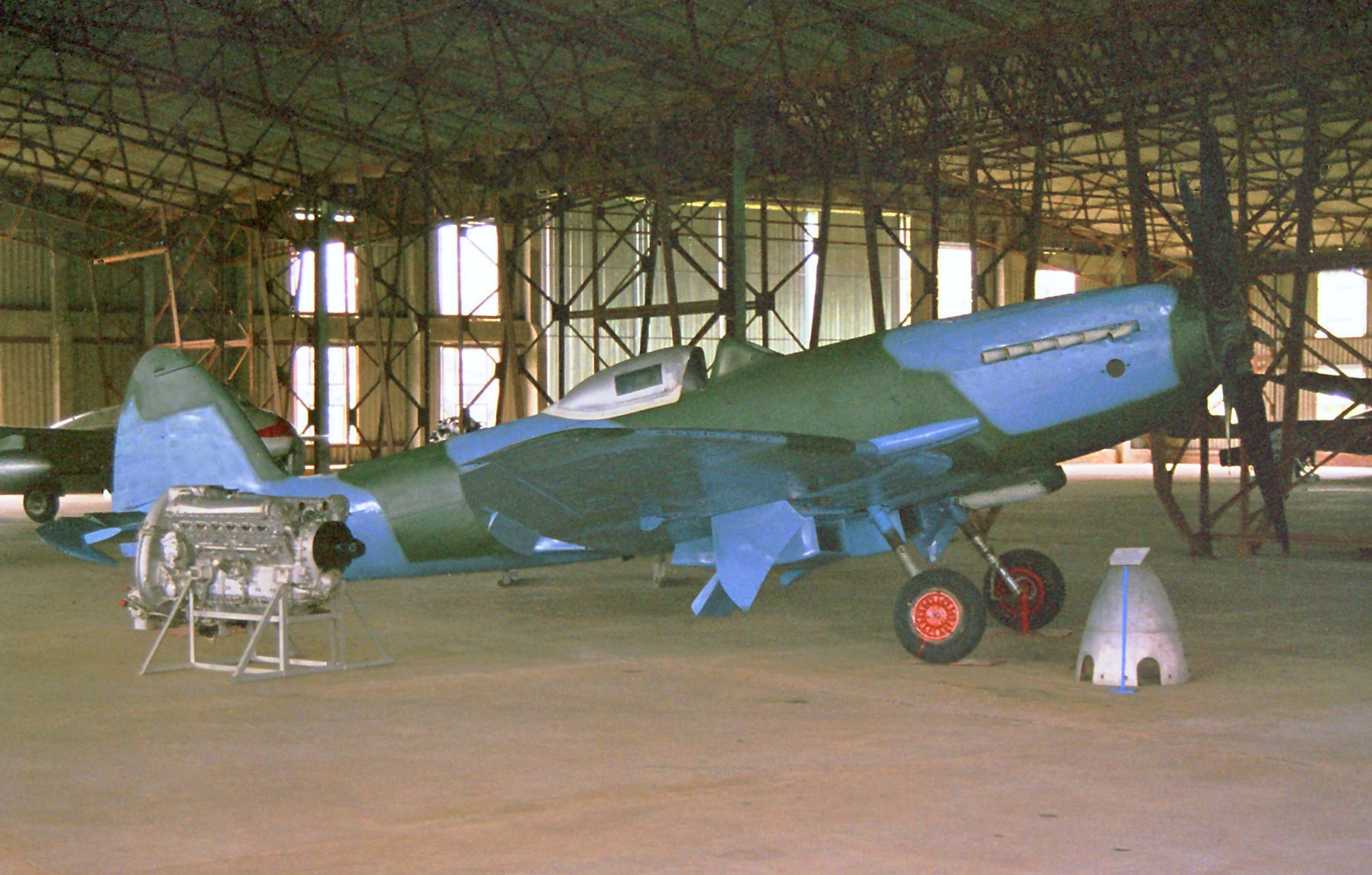
PK355 on display at Gweru, January 2006

Static display

- Spitfire F Mk.22 PK355. On display at the Gweru Military Museum, Gweru, Zimbabwe since 1993. PK355 was built at the Castle Bromwich factory, Birmingham and delivered to the Southern Rhodesian AF as SR.65 on 28 March 1951, it transferred to the Royal Rhodesian AF as RRAF65 in October 1954. After its active service PK355 was initially displayed at the Bulawayo Museum from June 1955 to 1957, then went on to be displayed mounted on a plinth at Thornhill Air Base, Rhodesia between 1960 and 1981. Displayed between 1981 and 1990 at New Sarum Air Base in the Zimbabwe Air Force Museum before transferring to its current location.
