= List of surviving Hawker Hurricanes =

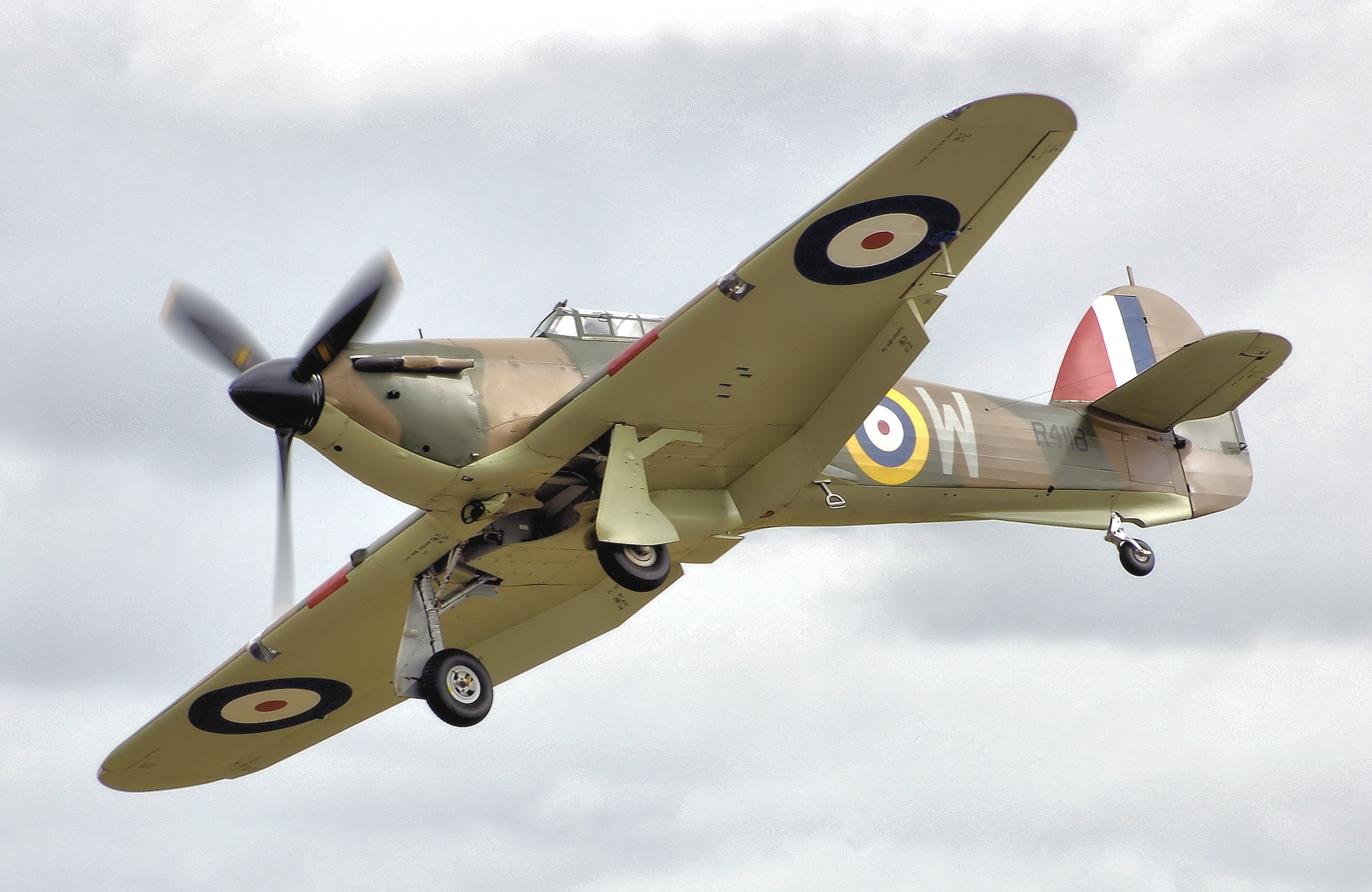
Hurricane Mk.I (R4118), a Hurricane from the 1940 Battle of Britain, still flying

The Hawker Hurricane is a British single-seat fighter aircraft used by the Royal Air Force and many other Allied countries throughout the Second World War. Replaced by newer designs later on during the Second World War, it has not survived as well as its contemporary, the Supermarine Spitfire.

Over 14,583 Hurricanes were built and at least 16 survive in airworthy condition worldwide, with other non-flying examples preserved by various air museums.

== Hawker Hurricanes ==
=== Australia ===
==== Airworthy ====
- Hurricane Mk.XII 5481 (registered C-FDNL) was imported from Canada in early 2014 and was returned to airworthy status, for a private owner, by Pay's Air Service at Scone, NSW. It made its first flight in Australia on 2 October 2016.

=== Belgium ===
==== On display ====
- Hurricane Mk.IIc LF658 is on display at Musee Royal De l'Armee, Brussels, Belgium.

=== Czech Republic ===
==== Airworthy ====
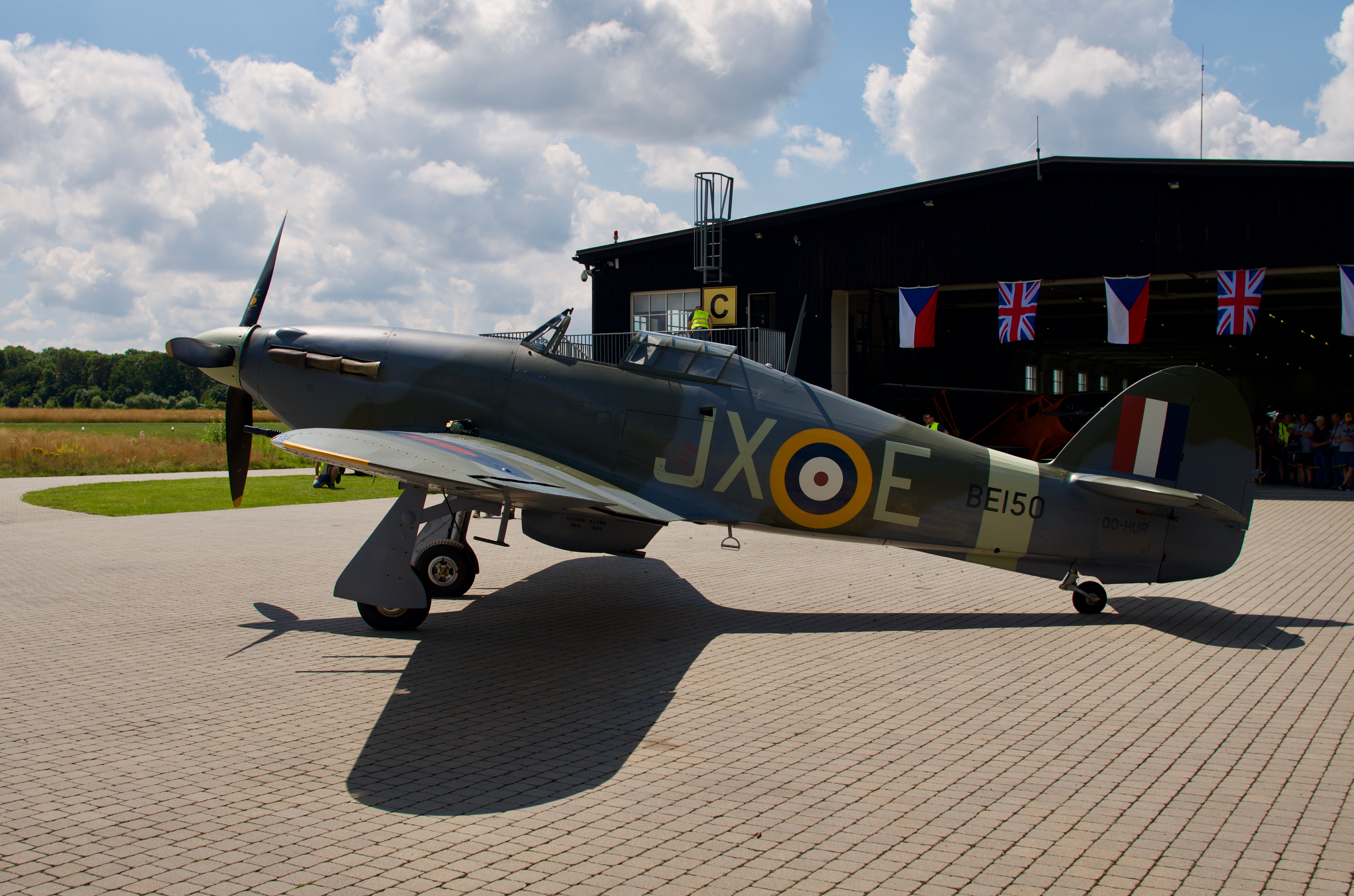
The last remaining airworthy Mark IV at Točná airport, before its crash in August 2022

- Hurricane Mk.IV KZ321 (previously registered G-HURY and CF-TPM) was the last surviving airworthy Mark IV. Built in the Kingston upon Thames factory in 1942, it served with No. 6 Squadron RAF in Grottaglie, Italy, and other squadrons in Greece and Yugoslavia. Abandoned in Palestine in 1947, the aircraft was returned to the UK in 1983. It was acquired by the Vintage Wings of Canada Collection, Gatineau, Quebec in 2006. This was sold in March 2018 and registered OO-HUR to Flying Aces Services & Training, making its first flight in Belgium on Sunday evening, 4 November 2018 at the Brasschaat Airfield. The plane has been sold to a private owner in the Czech Republic and restored with RAF livery JX-E commemorating Hurricane Mk.IIc of famous Czech WWII flying ace Karel Kuttelwascher. On 14 June 2021, the plane landed at Točná airport near Prague where it expanded the collection of airworthy historical aircraft under the registration OO-HUR. The plane crashed during Cheb Aviation Days on 14 August 2022, killing pilot Petr Paces.
- Hurricane Mk.IIa P3351 (registered F-AZXR, formerly ZK-TPK) was originally a Mk.I P3351. It was delivered to the RAF, and crashed near Prestwick on 21 July 1940. Rebuilt as Mk.IIa DR393, the aircraft was delivered to the Soviet Air Force in May 1941, serving for about two years before crashing near Murmansk, Russia in 1943. The hulk was eventually restored as a Mk.IIc in the UK from 1992 to 1995. It was transferred to New Zealand in 1995, and acquired by the New Zealand Fighter Pilots Museum, being rebuilt in its original identity as P3351 in Wānaka, New Zealand. Its first flight after restoration occurred in Christchurch on 12 January 2000. On 10 February 2013, it was bought by Jan Roozen from the Alpine Fighter Collection via Platinum Fighter Sales and shipped to France; it arrived at Le Havre on 30 March and was taken to Aero Restoration Service at Dijon for re-assembly; it was registered as F-AZXR on 14 May 2013. The plane was later bought by a private owner from the Czech Republic and restored as Hurricane P3134 (NN-D) that served with No 310 (Czechoslovak) Squadron RAF. From 2025 the plane is stationed at Točná airport in Prague.

=== Canada ===
==== Airworthy ====
- Hurricane Mk.XII 5418 is on display but fully operational at the Reynolds-Alberta Museum in Wetaskiwin, Alberta.
- Hurricane Mk.XII RCAF 5447 [registered as C-GGAJ], manufactured in 1942 by Canadian Car and Foundry, now part of collection at Vintage Wings of Canada, Gatineau, Quebec. Restored to represent LE-A as flown by F/O Willie McKnight. 5447 was struck off charge from RCAF in 1946.

==== On display ====
- Hurricane Mk.XII 5389 owned by the City of Calgary and on display at The Hangar Flight Museum. Restoration by the Calgary Mosquito Aircraft Society was completed in October 2019. The aircraft will soon have taxi-able status with a Packard Merlin 29 engine. The restoration work on the airframe is subcontracted out to Historic Aviation Services of Wetaskiwin, Alberta. During WWII this aircraft was assigned to No. 133 (Fighter) Squadron based at RCAF Station Boundary Bay, British Columbia for home defense.
- Hurricane Mk.XII 5461 is an airframe reconstructed around an original partial nose section, with many replica components (painted as "YO-J", No. 401 Squadron RCAF markings) on display at The Commonwealth Air Training Plan Museum, Brandon, Manitoba.
- Hurricane Mk.XII 5584 is on display at the Canadian Aviation Museum, Ottawa, Ontario.

=== Finland ===
==== On display ====
- Hurricane I N2394, Finnish Air Force serial number HC-452 is on display Aviation Museum of Central Finland (Keski-Suomen Ilmailumuseo), Tikkakoski, Finland. It is the second oldest extant Hurricane in the world, and still bears the Finnish 1942 painted camouflage.

=== India ===
==== On display ====
- Hurricane displayed as Mk.IIa AP832, and later AB832, though these serials have never been allocated (the former is in a deliberate blank block between Hurricane Mk.IIb's, and the latter is a deliberate blank block between Spitfire serials). The actual Mark of Hurricane is also in question (it is possibly Canadian built Mk.I P5202, but has the armored radiator of a Mk.IV, and the oil deflector ring of a Mk.II or later). The heritage of this aircraft and how it came to be in India is unknown, but it has been on display at the Indian Air Force Museum, Palam, New Delhi since 1975.

==== Stored or under restoration ====
- In 2021, the Indian Air Force Museum, Palam acquired a second Hurricane, a Mk.IIB, BN225, previously on outdoor display at the Police Academy at Moradabad. The aircraft was modified for outdoor display but its structure survives. The aircraft will require restoration to display standard.

=== Malta ===
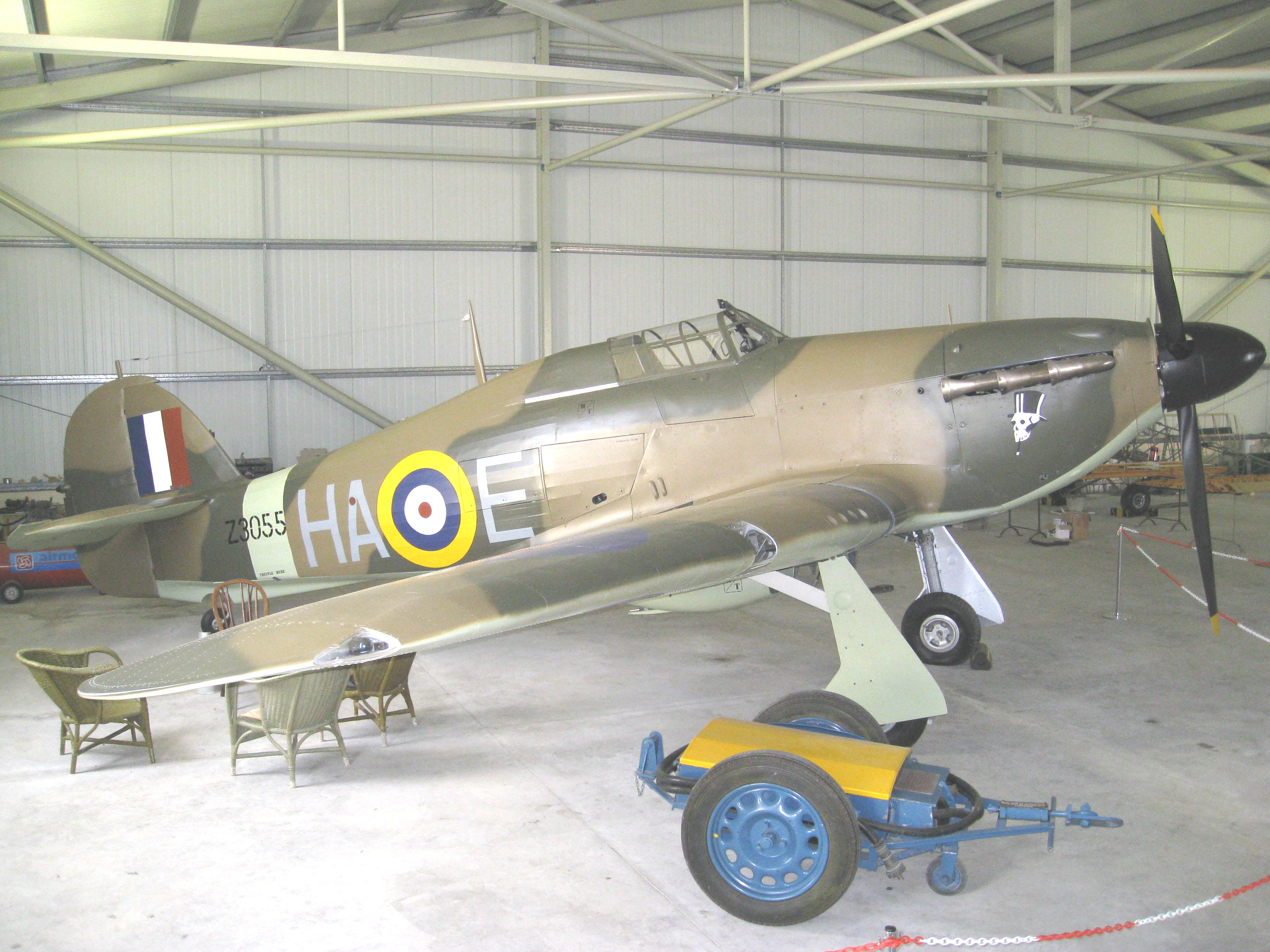
Hawker Hurricane IIa Z3055 on display at the Malta Aviation Museum

==== On display ====
- Hurricane Mk.IIa Z3055 was ditched off the coast of Malta on 9 July 1941. It was recovered on 19 July 1995, and restored to static display condition. It is on display at the Malta Aviation Museum, Takali Airfield, Malta.

=== Russia ===
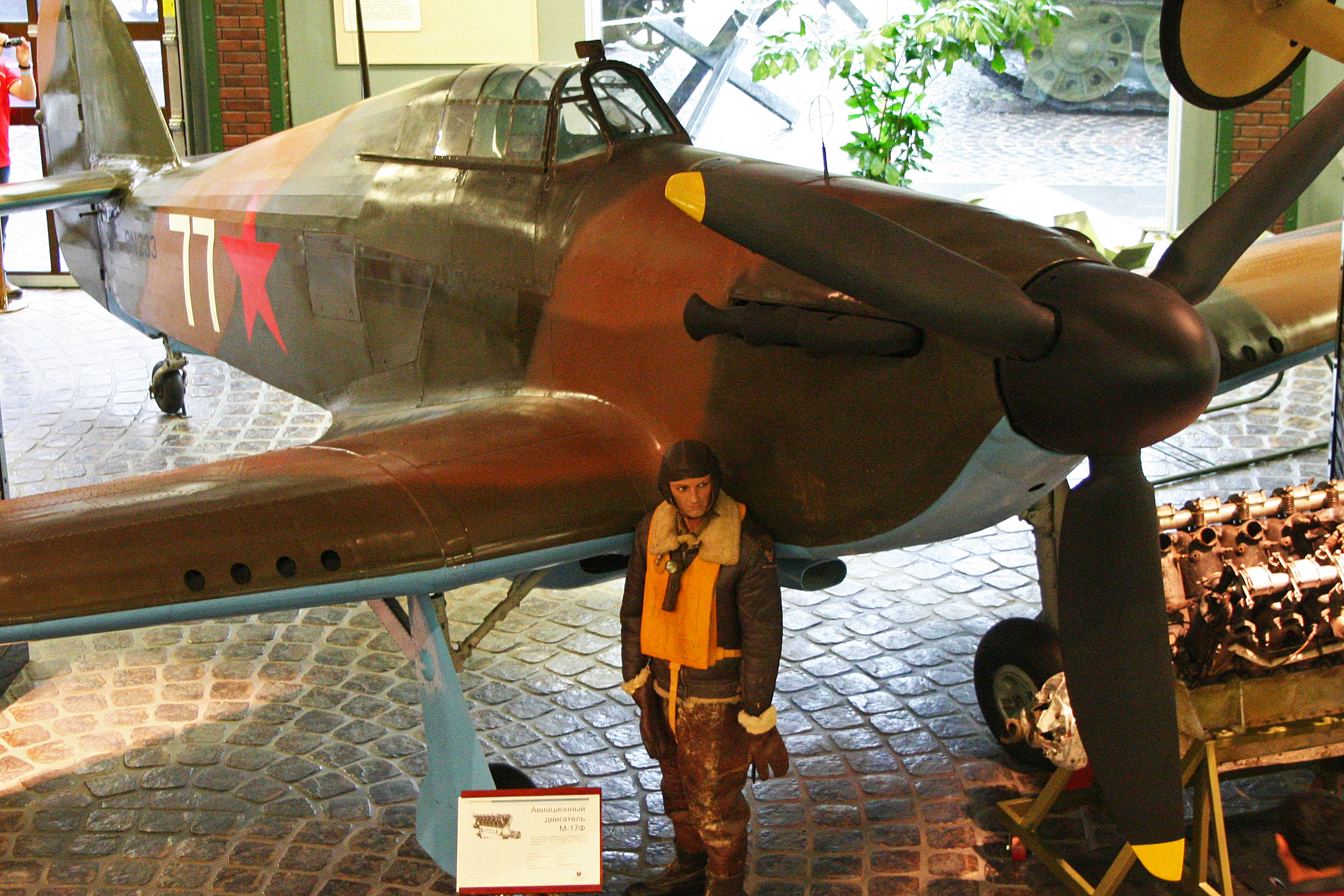
Hawker Hurricane IIB BN233 Technical Museum of Vadim Zadorozhny, Krasnogorsky, Moscow

==== On display ====
- Hurricane Mk.IIb Z5252 is at the Technical Museum of Vadim Zadorozhny, Krasnogorsky, near Moscow.
- Hurricane Mk.IIb AP740/BN233 is at the Technical Museum of Vadim Zadorozhny, Krasnogorsky, near Moscow.

=== Serbia ===
==== On display ====
- Hurricane Mk.IV RP LD975 is on display at the Aeronautical Museum in Belgrade, Serbia.

=== South Africa ===
==== On display ====
- Hurricane Mk.IIc LD619 is held by the South African National Museum of Military History, Saxonwold, Gauteng, Johannesburg.

=== United Kingdom ===
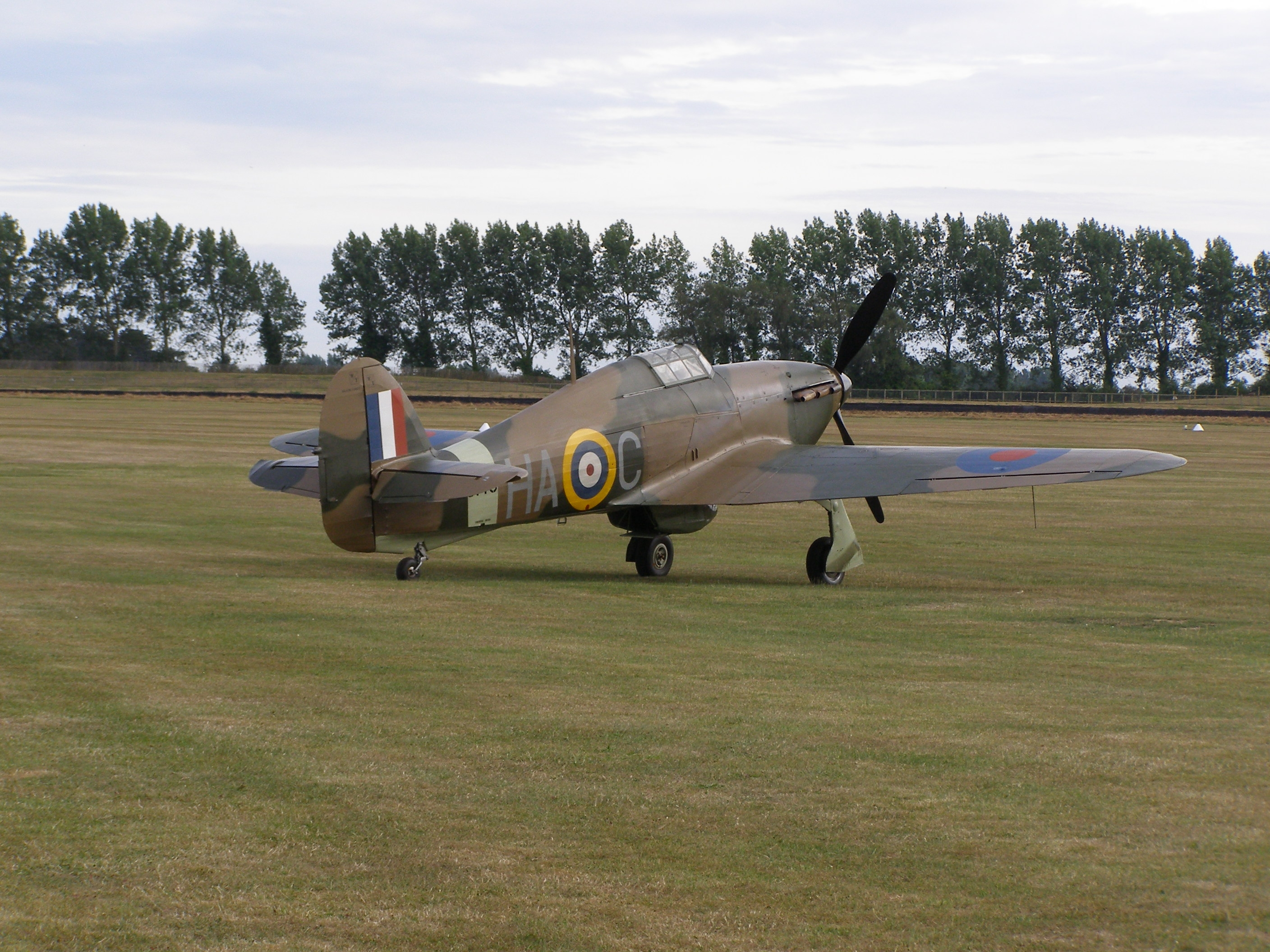
Canadian-built Hurricane Mk.XII painted to represent Hurricane Mk.IIb Z5140 of No. 126 Squadron RAF

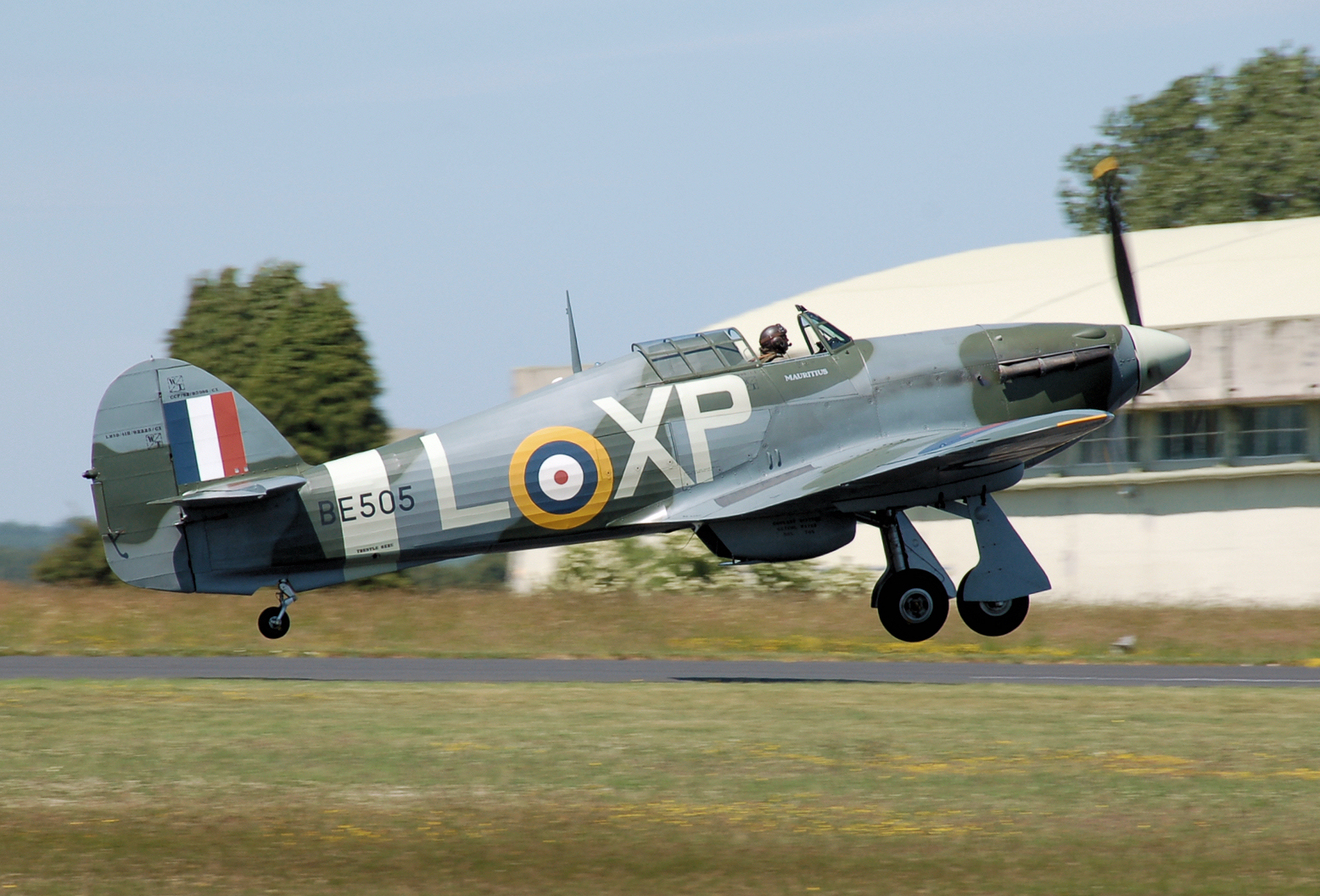
BE505 of Aerial Collective Duxford and Hurricane Heritage at North Weald, England, prior to its conversion to the world's only two-seat Hurricane.

==== Airworthy ====
- Hurricane Mk.I P2902 (registered G-ROBT), recovered wreck that crashed 31 May 1940 near Dunkirk.
- Hurricane Mk.I P3717 (registered G-HITT), recovered wreck from Russia, since traced to have Battle of Britain history.
- Hurricane Mk.I R4118 (one of the last flying Battle of Britain veterans; registered G-HUPW) is privately owned by Hurricane Heritage but since 2015 kept within the hangars of the Shuttleworth Collection (restored in 2004 by Hawker Restorations Ltd in the UK). Delivered new to No. 605 Squadron RAF at Drem on 17 August 1940. During the Battle of Britain, it flew 49 sorties from Croydon and shot down five enemy aircraft. Upon completion of its RAF service, it was sent to India as a training aircraft in December 1943, where it remained intact and in its packing crates until being struck off charge in 1947, after which it was sent to the Department of Aeronautical Engineering, Banaras Hindu University as an instructional airframe. Discovered in 1981 by Peter Vacher, returned to the UK in 2001 and restored to flying status, marking its first post-restoration flight (in nearly 60 years) on 23 December 2004. The aircraft is maintained by Duxford-based Aircraft Restoration Company.
- Hurricane Mk.XII P3700 (registered G-HURI), Canadian-built Hurricane Mk.XII, painted in 2015 to represent a Hurricane Mk.I RF-E No. 303 Squadron RAF and operated by the Historic Aircraft Collection, Duxford, Cambridgeshire.
- Hurricane Mk.IIc LF363 is operated by the Battle of Britain Memorial Flight, RAF Coningsby, Lincolnshire.
- Hurricane Mk.IIc PZ865, the last Hurricane built, operated by the Battle of Britain Memorial Flight at RAF Coningsby, Lincolnshire.
- Hurricane Mk.IIb BE505 (registered G-HHII), the last flying "Hurribomber", Originally restored in 2005 by Hawker Restorations Ltd in the UK, now the world's only two-seat Hurricane and is now maintained by Duxford-based Aircraft Restoration Company.
- Hurricane Mk.I V7497 (registered G-HRLI), recovered wreck that crashed 28 September 1940 operating with No. 501 Squadron RAF was restored by Hawker Restorations Limited of Sudbury, Suffolk. Returned to airworthy status on 30 August 2018 and now maintained by Duxford-based Aircraft Restoration Company.

==== On display ====
- Hurricane Mk.I L1592 is on display in 615 Squadron markings at the Science Museum, London. It also featured in Monty Python's "RAF Banter" sketch. It is the oldest surviving Hurricane, having seen action in France in 1939 as well as the Battle of Britain.
- Hurricane Mk.I P2617 formerly operated by 607 and 615 Squadron on display in 607 Sqn markings at the RAF Museum Hendon, London.
- The wreck of Hurricane Mk.I P3175 which crashed on 31 August 1940 with 257 Squadron is on display at the RAF Museum Hendon, London.
- Hurricane Mk.IIb Z2315, a former Russian operated aircraft on display at the Imperial War Museum Duxford displayed in No. 111 Squadron RAF markings.
- Hurricane Mk.IIa Z2389, acquired from Russia via the late Jim Pearce in 1997, is in static display at the Brooklands Museum, Weybridge.
- Hurricane Mk.IV KX829 is on display at the Thinktank, Birmingham Science Museum, painted as P3395 as flown by Flight Lieutenant Arthur Clowes DFM of No. 1 Squadron RAF.
- Hurricane Mk.II LF738 is on display at the RAF Museum Cosford, Shropshire.
- Hurricane Mk.II LF751 painted as BN230 of No. 43 Squadron RAF and displayed at the Hurricane and Spitfire Memorial Museum at the former RAF Manston.

==== Stored or under restoration ====
- Hurricane Mk.IV KZ191 last operated by the Israeli Defence Force, privately owned in Berkshire.
- Hurricane Mk.IIb Z5207 (registered G-BYDL), a former Russian aircraft, is privately owned and stored in Gloucestershire.
- Hurricane Mk.XII (registered G-CBOE), a Canadian-built aircraft operated by the RCAF as 5487 and crashed in 1942 is privately owned in Hampshire.
- Hurricane Mk.IIb BH238, the wreck of a former Russian aircraft, is privately owned and stored on the Isle of Wight.
- Hurricane Mk.I L1639 of No. 85 Squadron RAF from Battle of France is being restored to airworthy condition by Cambridge Bomber and Fighter Society at Little Gransden Airfield in Cambridgeshire.

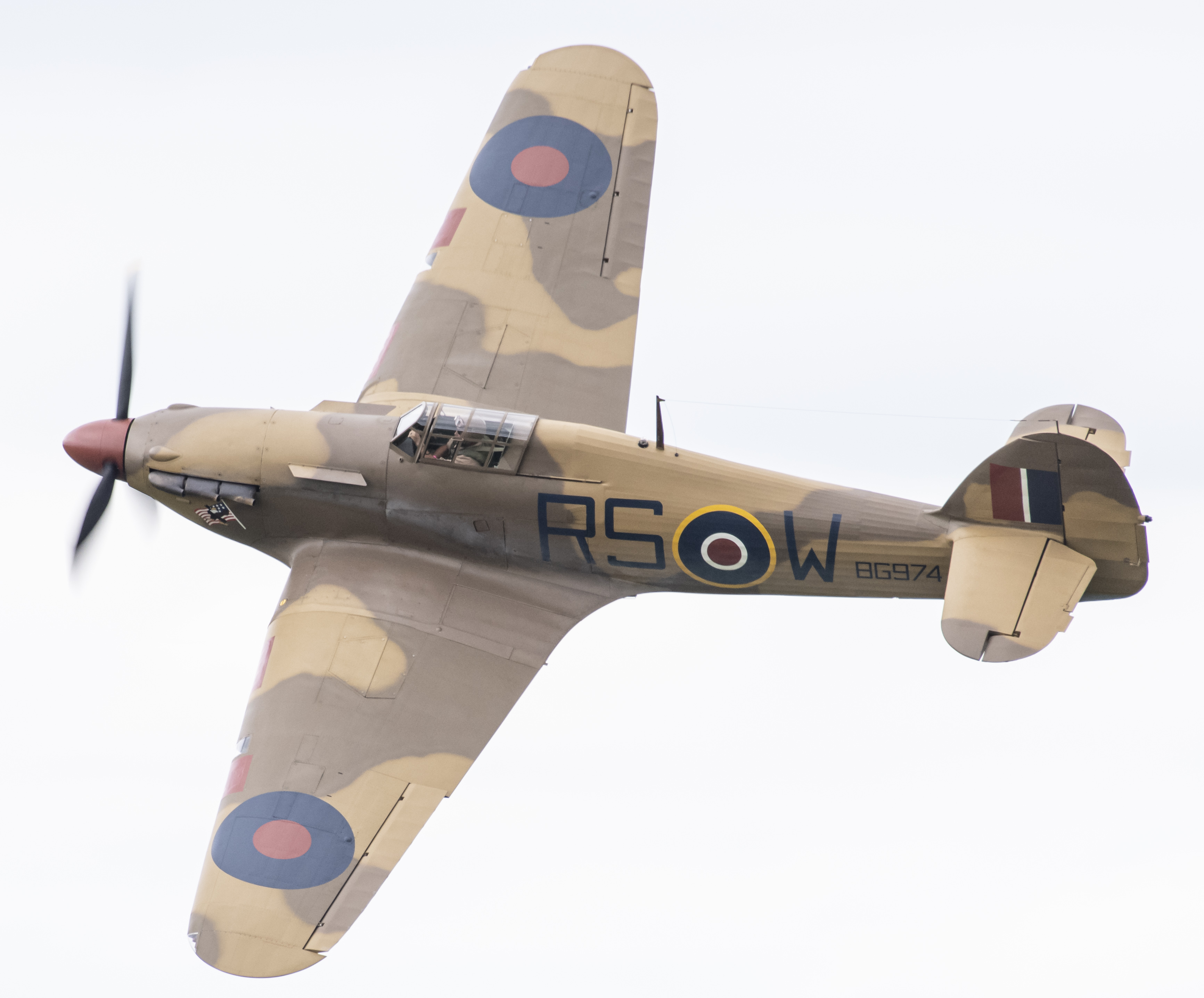
Hawker Hurricane Mk.XII, registration N6RW.

=== United States ===
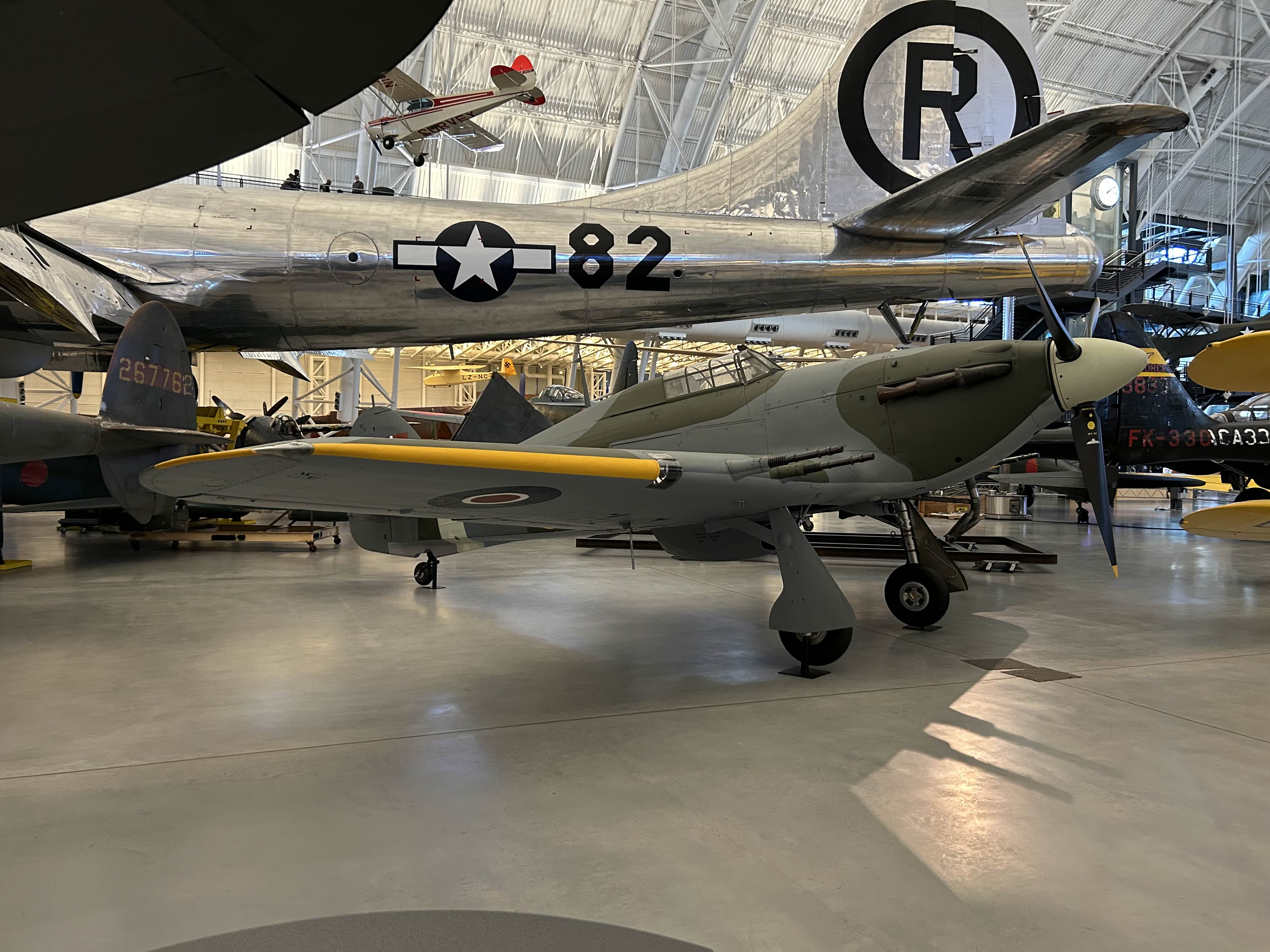
Hawker Hurricane Mk.IIc LF686 at the Steven F. Udvar-Hazy Center in Chantilly, Virginia.

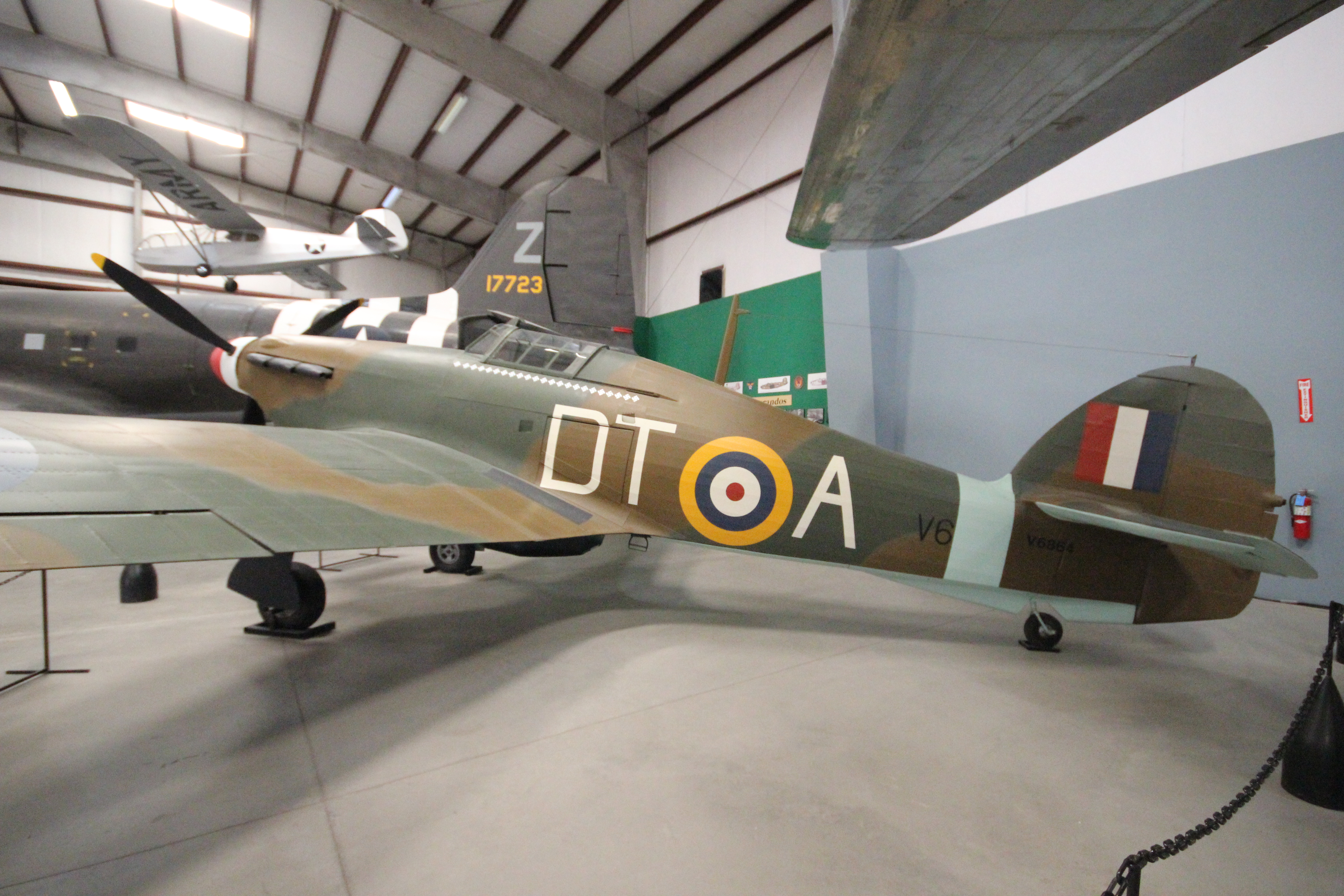
Hawker Hurricane at the Pima Air & Space Museum

==== Airworthy ====
- Hurricane Mk.XII 5667 (registered N2549) operated by the Military Aviation Museum near Virginia Beach in Pungo, Virginia.
- Hurricane Mk.XII 5708 (CCF 96; registered N96RW) is owned by Lone Star Hurricane LLC and is part of the collection at the Dakota Territory Air Museum.

==== On Display / In Storage ====
- Hurricane Mk.IIc LF686 is on display at the Steven F. Udvar-Hazy Center of the National Air and Space Museum of the Smithsonian Institution, Washington, D.C.
- Hurricane Mk.II V6864 is on display at the Pima Air & Space Museum, adjacent to Davis-Monthan AFB in Tucson, Arizona. Composite of five Hurricanes in the markings of Robert Stanford Tuck while flying with No. 257 Squadron RAF in Summer, 1940.
- Hurricane Mk.XII 5390 is on display at the National Museum of the US Air Force at Wright-Patterson AFB in Dayton, Ohio; it is of Canadian manufacture and is painted to represent an aircraft of the No. 71 or "Eagle" Squadron RAF, composed of U.S. citizens who volunteered for British/Canadian service in the RAF beginning in September 1940 prior to US entry into World War II late the following year. It is marked as Hurricane Mk.IIa Z3174.

== Hawker Sea Hurricanes ==
=== Germany ===
==== Airworthy ====
- Sea Hurricane Mk.XIIA BW874 Operated by Meier Motors at Bremgarten in Munich

=== United Kingdom ===
==== Airworthy ====
- Sea Hurricane Mk.Ib Z7015 (registered G-BKTH) operated by Shuttleworth Collection Old Warden, England. This is a Canadian built machine, originally a Mk.I but converted to a Sea Hurricane after arrival in the UK. Former service with 759 and 880 Naval Air Squadrons of the Fleet Air Arm.
- Sea Hurricane Mk.X AE977 (registered G-CHTK) painted as 'P2921' / 'GZ-L' based at Biggin Hill Airport, London, England.

=== United States ===
==== Airworthy ====
- Sea Hurricane Mk.XIIA BW881 Flys as 5429 operated by the Flying Heritage & Combat Armor Museum at Paine Field in Everett, Washington.

== See also ==
- Hawker Hurricane PZ865
