= Jimmy Whalen =

Canadian World War II flying ace

James Henry Whalen DFC
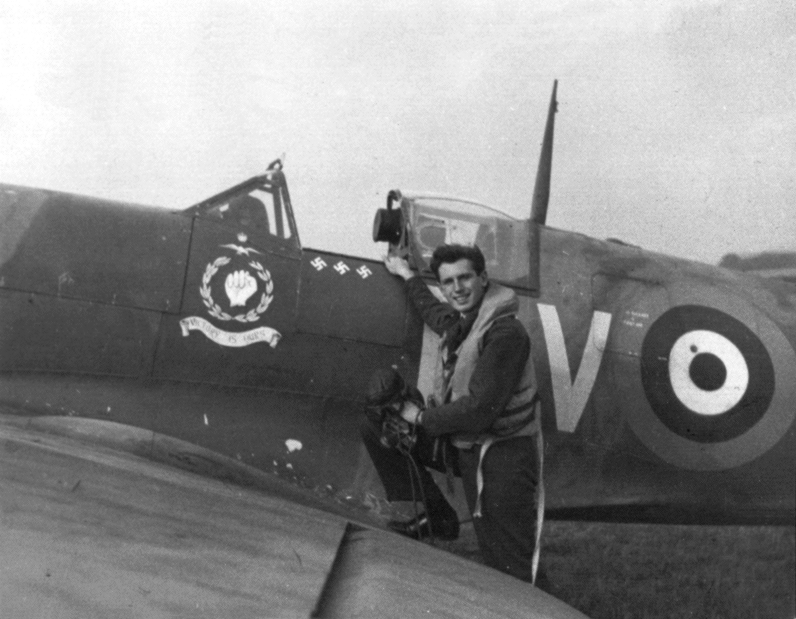
- Whalen in 1941
- Born: 23 April 1920; Vancouver, British Columbia
- Died: 18 April 1944 (aged 23); Kohima, India
- Burial place: War Cemetery in Kohima, Commemorative Nagaland
- Military career
- Allegiance: Canada; United Kingdom
- Branch: Royal Canadian Air Force; Royal Air Force
- Service years: 1940–1944
- Rank: Flight Lieutenant
- Conflicts: World War II; Battle of France; Burma Campaign 1944–45
- Awards: Distinguished Flying Cross

Flight Lieutenant James Henry Whalen DFC (23 April 1920 – 18 April 1944) was a Canadian Second World War fighter pilot ace.

== Biography ==
Jimmy Whalen was born in Vancouver, British Columbia on 23 April 1920. He graduated from Kitsilano Secondary School in June, 1938. He had joined The Seaforth Highlanders of Canada Army Cadets in 1937. In 1940, the Royal Canadian Air Force (RCAF) formed the Royal Canadian Air Cadets with the first squadron starting in Vancouver, and so he transferred to 111 Squadron.

After his RCAF application was accepted, he became one of the first candidates of the new British Commonwealth Air Training Plan, training in Ottawa, Ontario receiving his wings on 25 January 1941. He received a commission as a Pilot Officer, only to have it rescinded after he was caught low flying a Harvard trainer under the local Ottawa/Hull Bridge.

== Posting to Great Britain ==
In March 1941, Whalen was posted to the No. 2 AACU (Anti-Aircraft Co-operation Unit) in Gosport, England. In June, 1941 he was posted to 57 OTU (Operational Training Unit) in Wrexham, Wales for operational training on the Spitfire. He was rated "Above average" by his instructors.

On 1 August 1941, Whalen was posted to No. 129 (Mysore) Squadron, based at RAF Leconfield. The next day he was sent up on his first combat sortie. On that mission Pilot Officer Cunliffe downed the squadron's first enemy aircraft, a Ju 88. On 28 August, the squadron transferred to RAF Westhampnett, Sussex as part of the Tangmere Wing, taking delivery of the new Spitfire Mk Vb.

On 17 September 1941, 129 Squadron was on a fighter sweep near Fruges when they ran into a flight of German Bf 109s. In the ensuing dogfight Whalen downed a Bf 190E and a Bf 109F. The dogfight consumed much of his fuel and he crashed landed at Hurstpierpoint.

Four days later, on a sweep over Gosnay, near the Pas de Calais, 129 Squadron ran into a large group of enemy fighters. In the ensuing melee Squadron Leader Armitage and Pilot Officer Lloyd MacDonald were both shot down (Armitage survived and was taken prisoner). Whalen downed his third Bf 109E and damaged another.

Jimmy described the engagements in a letter to his family:

I was on a sweep leading green section when I saw a ME 109F about to attack my number two. I turned after him and shot him down and then lost our squadron. I was going to head for England when I saw a squadron above about ten to twenty miles inside France. I didn't know who they were so I headed towards them. When I was close enough I saw that they were ME 109E's. About 12-15 flying in formation . I attacked shooting down the first Gerry. I missed the next then damaged a third, who might have crashed, and was going to shoot at a fourth when my ammunition was finished. I could see nothing but Gerrys around me and I beat it for England as fast as I could go doing all kinds of queer maneuvers to keep the ME 109's away from me. That was my first fight and yesterday I had my second. We were on a sweep just crossing the coast when 90 + ME 109's attacked us. I had a couple of unsuccessful brushes and being separated from the rest my number two and I started to fight our way home. We were attacked by four ME 109's out over the Channel, we took on two apiece but mine headed for France. I lost my number two then and was headed for home when I saw two of three ME 109's that were attacking a damaged Spitfire. I attacked them shooting the first down and damaging the other and was then attacked by the third ME 109. He hit out for France after a slight scrap and I returned to base. The pilot of the damaged Spitfire said he thought I was an angel from heaven when he saw me coming to help him.

On 20 October, the squadron made a strike on Le Havre and Dieppe and ran into heavy anti-aircraft fire from German flak ships. Seeking to suppress the fire, Whalen's aircraft took a number of hits. He continued to shoot at the flak ship with cannon and machine gun fire until it was put out of action.

== India and Burma ==
On 7 December 1941, the Japanese attacked Pearl Harbor and other Allied Southeast Asian targets. With British interests in Asia threatened, Whalen volunteered to be sent to defend India and Burma. On 3 January 1942 Whalen was on his way to India and at Port Sudan he started familiarisation flying on the Hurricane and Kittyhawk.

On 22 February 1942, Whalen was assigned to No. 30 Squadron RAF, which had seen action in the Western Desert. On 27 February the squadron was embarked onto the aircraft carrier HMS Indomitable headed for Colombo, Ceylon (now Sri Lanka).

On 6 March 1942, the squadron took off from the aircraft carrier for their new base at RAF Ratmalana assigned to defend the large Royal Navy fleet stationed at Colombo. On 4 April 1942, a Japanese strike force under the command of Vice-Admiral Chūichi Nagumo, fresh from their attack on Pearl Harbor, attacked Ceylon with some 120 carrier-based aircraft. The RAF had 40 defending fighters, consisting of Royal Navy Fulmars and RAF Hurricanes.

Whalen flew over Colombo at 15000 feet and attacked a formation of Val bombers. In his first pass he downed two of the bombers. He climbed once more, then attacked again, shooting another down. A flight of Zeros attacked his Hurricane, however his Flight Leader, Flight Lieutenant Bob Davidson, also of Vancouver, downed the Zero chasing Whalen. By the end of the action 27 RAF and FAA (Navy) aircraft had been lost in the battle, with 17 airmen killed and 11 injured. The pilots of 30 Squadron claimed 14 enemy aircraft destroyed, 6 more probably destroyed, and 5 more damaged, out of a total of 19 destroyed, 7 probably destroyed, and 9 damaged in air combat.

Whalen's tally was now six confirmed enemy aircraft and 1 damaged. He was now officially a fighter ace. In December 1942 he was transferred to No. 17 Squadron RAF in Calcutta, flying fighter bomber and army support missions.

In June 1943, 17 Squadron was moved to RAF Agartala. From there they made sorties against the Japanese in Burma, strafing targets of opportunity, particularly sampans transporting troops and supplies along the rivers.

In August, Whalen was transferred to No. 34 Squadron RAF based at Madras flying the Hawker Hurricane IIc, converted to hold two 250 lb bombs. In November 1943, the squadron was moved to an airstrip at Palel, Manipur.

=== Battles of Kohima and Imphal ===
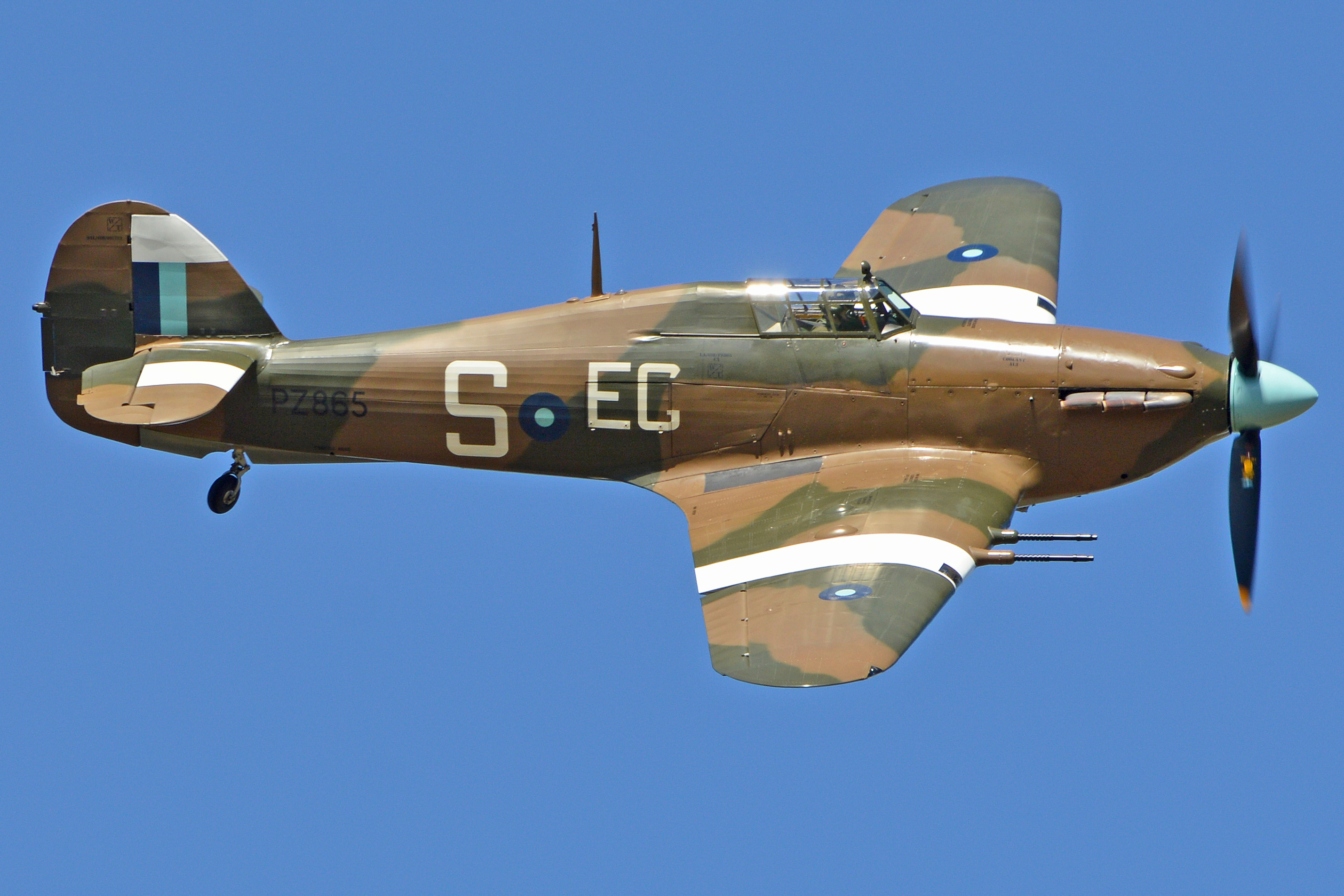
Hawker Hurricane PZ865, in the livery of HW840, code letters EG-S, flown by Whalen

The Battle of Imphal saw the Japanese attack directly toward Imphal from Burma. To the north, Kohima was attacked by the Japanese 31st Division, defended by a mere 3000 strong Allied force. No. 34 squadron was moved to Assam to provide ground support for these troops. The squadron flew intensive multiple bombing and strafing missions daily throughout the two-week battle, running a gauntlet of small arms and light anti-aircraft fire in the process. On 18 April 1944 Whalen was leading a flight of the squadron's Hurricanes against Japanese troops at the rifle range at Kohima. The incident was related by his wingman Flight Sgt. Jack Morton:

We were flying from Dergaon when Jimmy was killed. He led six Hurricanes on an attack on the Rifle Range and I was his No. 2. We bombed in sections of two and Jimmy and I were first in bombing with two 250 lb. Bombs with 11 second delays fitted. I was slightly behind Jimmy and we dropped our bombs at about 50 feet and as we left the target area Jimmy's plane did a barrel roll and crashed. It was a very sad day on the Squadron because he was by far the most popular officer and pilot in both the Officers and Sergeants Mess. We carried out two more attacks that day and on both occasions we looked for his plane but there was nothing to be seen in the dense jungle.

Flight Lieutenant Whalen was awarded the Distinguished Flying Cross backdated to 17 April 1944. His Hurricane, with Whalen still strapped into the cockpit, was found in June 1944 by Royal Engineer Peter Toole. He is buried with the other defenders of Kohima at the War Cemetery in Kohima. A photo of the headstone of his grave in the cemetery is here.

== Battle of Britain Memorial Flight ==
In 2010, the Battle of Britain Memorial Flight rebuilt Hawker Hurricane PZ865, the last Hurricane built. Between 2012 and 2020 the Hurricane wore a colour scheme replicating Hurricane Mk.IIC HW840, coded 'EG-S', of 34 Squadron, South East Asia Command during 1944, the personal aircraft of Canadian pilot, Flight Lieutenant Jimmy Whalen DFC.
