= Karel Kuttelwascher =

Czech pilot (1916–1959)

Karel Miloslav Kuttelwascher
- Born: 23 September 1916; Svatý Kříž, Bohemia, Austria-Hungary
- Died: 17 August 1959 (aged 42); St Austell, England
- Burial place: Uxbridge, England
- Military career
- Allegiance: (Czech Republic) Czechoslovakia; France; United Kingdom
- Branch: Czechoslovak Air Force; French Foreign Legion; French Air Force; Royal Air Force
- Service years: 1934–46
- Rank: Squadron Leader
- Nicknames: Kut; Czech Night Hawk
- Units: 44 Fighter Unit 32 Fighter Unit; French Foreign Legion; Groupe de Chasse III/3; No. 1 Squadron RAF; No. 23 Squadron RAF; Czechoslovak Air Inspectorate; No. 32 Maintenance Unit RAF Czechoslovak Military Air Academy
- Commands: "A" Flight, No. 1 Squadron RAF
- Conflicts: Second World War; Battle of France; Battle of Britain; Channel Dash
- Awards: Order of the White Lion (posthumous); Czechoslovak War Cross 1939–1945 × 5; Československá medaile Za chrabrost před nepřítelem; Československá medaile za zásluhy, 1st Class; Pamětní medaile československé armády v zahraničí; Distinguished Flying Cross & Bar; 1939–1945 Star with Battle of Britain clasp; Air Crew Europe Star; Croix de Guerre with palm & silver star
- Other work: British European Airways pilot

Karel Miloslav Kuttelwascher DFC and Bar (23 September 1916 – 17 August 1959) was a Czech fighter pilot, and a flying ace of the UK's Royal Air Force (RAF) in the Second World War. He was in combat service from May 1940 to October 1942, first with the French Air Force and then with the RAF.

Kuttelwascher, nicknamed "Kut", was the RAF's most successful Czechoslovak pilot, and one of the RAF's highest-scoring flying aces overall. In RAF service he shot down 18 enemy aircraft. He may also have scored numerous victories in French Air Force service, but these are unconfirmed as many French records were lost.

In 1945 Kuttelwascher returned to Czechoslovakia but in 1946 he returned to Britain, where he made a civilian flying career with British European Airways. He died of a heart attack in 1959, aged 42.

== Early life ==
Kuttelwascher was born in 1916 in the village of Svatý Kříž in Bohemia, now part of Havlíčkův Brod in the Czech Republic. He was the third of six children. Their parents Josef and Kristina Kuttelwascher were ethnic Germans from Bavaria. The family name means tripe washer.

Aged 17, Kuttelwascher started work as a clerk at a flour mill in Kladno northwest of Prague. On 1 October 1934, aged 18, he joined the Czechoslovak Air Force. In March 1937, he qualified as a pilot and was posted to 4 Flying Regiment at Kbely airfield near Prague. There he trained as a fighter pilot, completing his training in May 1938. He was posted to 1 Air Regiment, which assigned him to the 32nd Fighter Unit. The unit was posted to defend Czechoslovak airspace over Moravia and Slovakia, but after the Munich Agreement in September 1938, it returned to base at Hradec Králové in northern Bohemia.

Germany occupied Czechoslovakia on 15 March 1939 and dissolved the Czechoslovak Air Force the next day. On the night of 13/14 June, Kuttelwascher and six other Czechoslovaks escaped in a coal train from Ostrava in Czech Silesia to Bohumín, a former Czechoslovak town which Poland had annexed in October 1938. The group reported to the Czechoslovak Consulate in Kraków and was accommodated in a Czechoslovak transit camp at Bronowice Małe that had been converted from a disused Austro-Hungarian Army camp.

On 29 July 1939, Kuttelwascher and his group went to the Port of Gdynia, where they embarked on a Swedish cargo steamship, the Kastelholm, to travel to France. In Gdynia, a group of Polish officials belatedly tried to persuade the Czechoslovaks to stay and join the Polish Air Force. A few, including another future RAF ace, Josef František, agreed to do so after tossing a coin. The remainder, including Kuttelwascher, stuck to their decision to leave Poland. On 30 July, they disembarked in the Port of Calais in France.

== French service ==
Peacetime regulations did not allow the French Air Force to enlist people who were not French citizens. But the Czechoslovak Ambassador in Paris reached agreement with the French Government that Czechoslovak volunteers could join the French Foreign Legion for a five-year term, on the understanding that if war broke out they would be released to form a Czechoslovak army in exile. Kuttelwascher and his group joined the Foreign Legion and were posted to Sidi Bel Abbès in French Algeria for army training and to learn French.

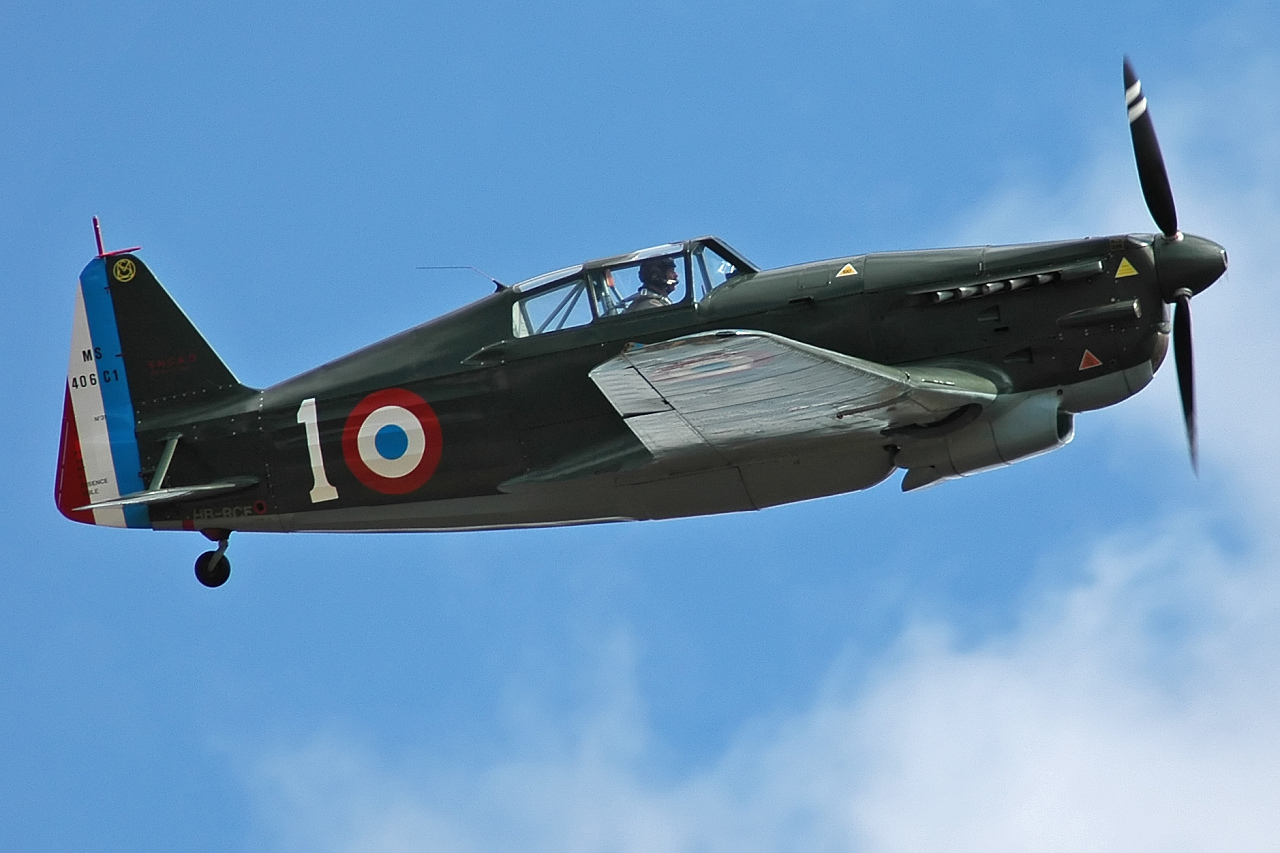
A Morane-Saulnier M.S.406 fighter aircraft

On 3 September 1939, France and the United Kingdom declared war on Germany. On 17 November, the French Government and Czechoslovak National Liberation Committee agreed that Czechoslovak airmen would be transferred from the Foreign Legion to the French Air Force pending the formation of a Czechoslovak air force. Kuttelwascher was one of about 100 who were sent to the fighter training base at Chartres Aerodrome, where he quickly learnt to fly the Morane-Saulnier M.S.406C.1 fighter. However, he was not transferred to a combat squadron until 17 May 1940, when he was assigned to Groupe de Chasse III/3 at Beauvais–Tillé.

Four days later, GC III/3 moved to Cormeilles-en-Vexin, where it was re-equipped with the more modern Dewoitine D.520C.1 fighter. As German forces advanced in the Battle of France, GC III/3 retreated, first to Illiers-l'Évêque and then successively to Germinon, Chapelle-Vallon, Montargis, Grand Mallerey, Avord Air Base, and Perpignan-La Salanque.

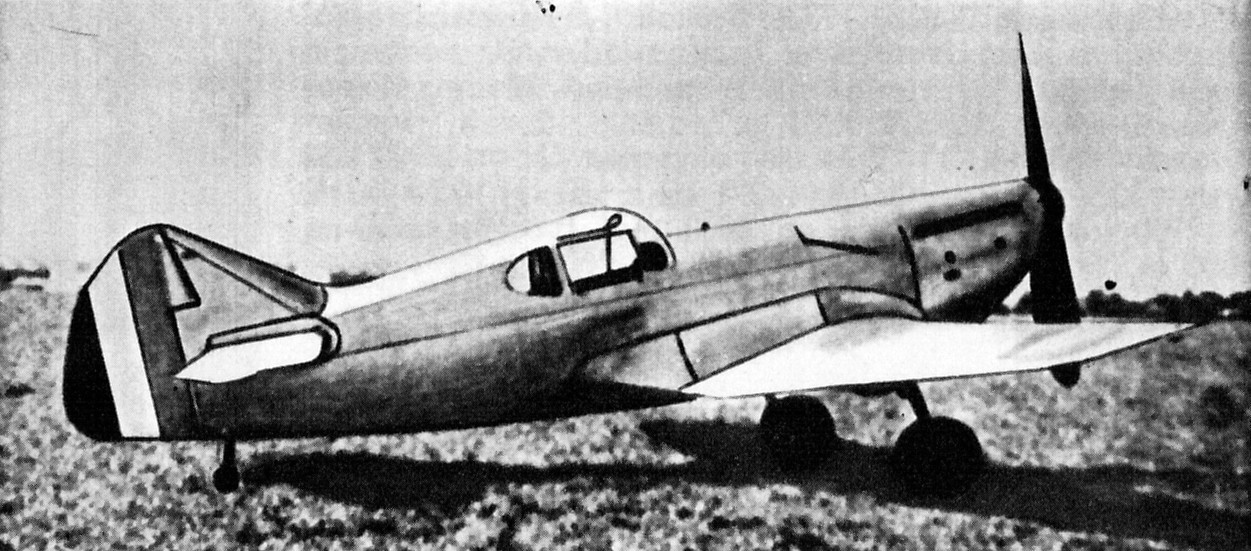
A Dewoitine D.520 fighter aircraft

On 17 June, the UK Foreign Office sent a signal to its Ambassador to France, Sir Ronald Campbell, who had evacuated from Paris to Bordeaux, asking him to give the Czechoslovak General Sergej Ingr an order from President Beneš to evacuate all Czechoslovak personnel and as many aircraft as possible to England. However, in the chaos engulfing France, the order reached few if any Czechoslovak personnel, and Kuttelwascher and his comrades continued to serve with their French units.

Kuttelwascher claimed that, while with the French Air Force, he destroyed or damaged several enemy aircraft. French records for that period are incomplete, but those which survive include two confirmed kills and one probable by Kuttelwascher.

On 22 June 1940, remnants of GC III/3 withdrew to Realizane in Algeria, but that same day France surrendered. The defeated French Air Force discharged its Czechoslovak personnel on 1 July. A group including Kuttelwascher travelled by train to Casablanca in Morocco, where Czechoslovak personnel were assembling to escape to the UK. On 9 July, they left the Port of Casablanca aboard a Scottish ferry, the Royal Scotsman, which took them to Gibraltar. On 19 July, they sailed from Gibraltar aboard the Elder Dempster Lines ship David Livingstone, reaching Cardiff Docks in Wales on 5 August.

== RAF service ==
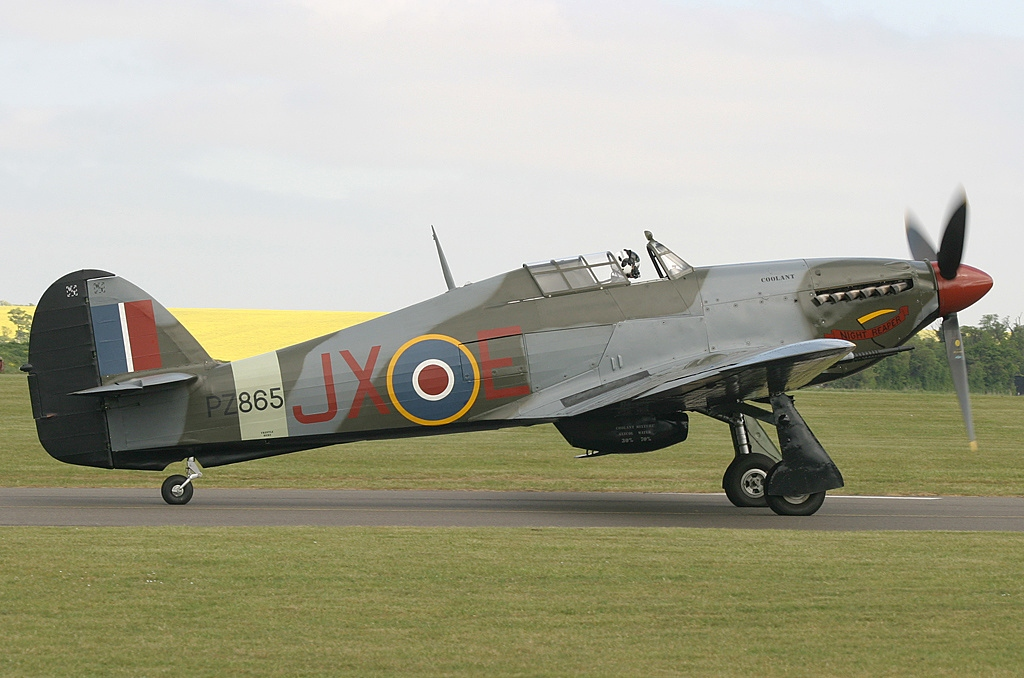
Hawker Hurricane PZ865 in the livery of Hurricane BE581, code letters JX-E, flown by Kuttelwascher

After a short stay in a transit camp, Kuttelwascher joined the RAF on 14 August 1940 with a rank of flight sergeant. He was posted to a Czechoslovak depot at RAF Cosford in Shropshire and then to No. 5 Operational Training Unit at RAF Aston Down in Gloucestershire, where he learnt to fly the Hawker Hurricane.

=== Hurricane pilot with No. 1 Squadron ===
On 3 October 1940, Kuttelwascher was posted to No. 1 Squadron RAF, which was equipped with the Hurricane Ia. He fought in the latter part of the Battle of Britain. In December, the squadron was moved to RAF Northolt and flew combat missions over northern France. On 2 February 1941, Kuttelwascher may have shot down a Messerschmitt Bf 109 fighter near Boulogne. On 8 April 1941, he achieved his first confirmed kill in RAF service by shooting down a Bf 109 near Cap Gris Nez. He shot down a second Bf 109 between Calais and Dunkirk on 21 May and a third near Le Touquet on 27 June. By the summer he was promoted to flight lieutenant.

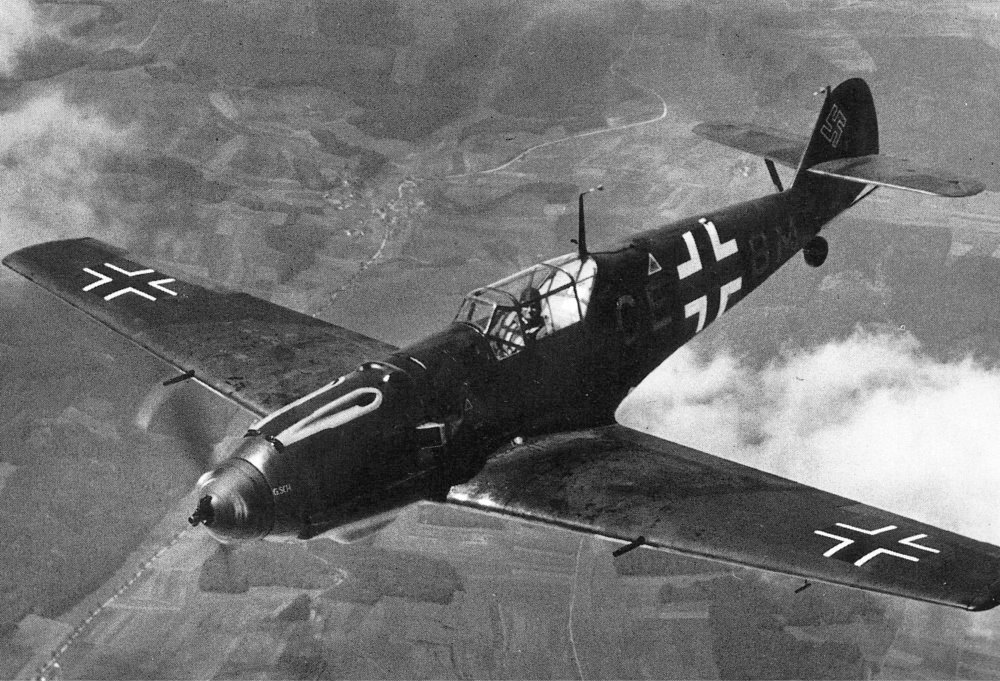
A Messerschmitt Bf 109 fighter. Kuttelwascher shot down two Bf 109s in April and May 1941.

In 1941 at a dance in Ruislip, Middlesex, Kuttelwascher met Beryl Ruby Thomas. They were married in 1942.

On 12 February 1942, No. 1 Squadron attacked German destroyers in the English Channel that were escorting the Scharnhorst-class battleships Scharnhorst and Gneisenau in the Channel Dash. The squadron lost two aircraft, but Kuttelwascher managed to damage one of the destroyers with his Hispano-Suiza HS.404 20mm cannon.

No. 1 Squadron was relocated to RAF Tangmere in West Sussex and assigned a new role: night intruder sorties over France. These were missions by single aircraft to shoot down German bombers over their own airfields. Their Hurricanes lacked radar so the sorties were made only with a full moon. They were dangerous missions, demanding both navigation and flying skills, excellent vision and great courage.

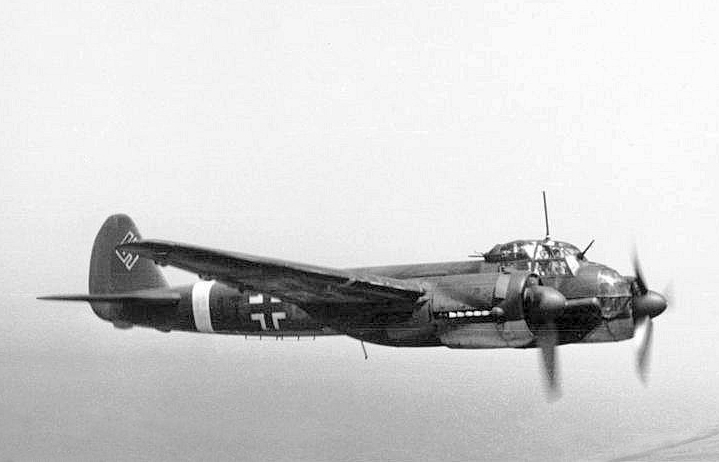
A Junkers Ju 88 fighter-bomber. Between April and June 1942 Kuttelwascher shot down two Ju 88s and damaged another three.

The squadron was then operating the Hawker Hurricane Mk IIc, painted black for night flying. Each aircraft was equipped with two 45-gallon under-wing auxiliary tanks that extended its airborne time to three to 3½ flying hours and gave a range of about 900 miles (1,400 km). Armament was two Hispano-Suiza 20mm cannon on each wing, but with only 91 rounds of ammunition. This was enough for only about nine seconds of firing time.

Kuttelwascher's Hawker Hurricane IIc was serial number BE581 and carried the code letters "JX-E". It also carried a personal emblem of a yellow scythe with a red banner emblazoned "Night Reaper". Kuttelwascher had the greatest number of successful strikes of any night intruder.

On the night of 1/2 April 1942, Kuttelwascher scored his first victories as a night intruder, shooting down one Junkers Ju 88 fighter-bomber and damaging a second, both near Melun. On the night of 16/17 April, he shot down a Dornier Do 217 bomber near Saint-André-de-l'Eure. His next victories were a Do 217 and a Ju 88, both near Rouen-Boos. On the night of 30 April/1 May, he shot down a Do 217 near Rennes and a Heinkel He 111 bomber off the coast near Dinard. On the night of 4/5 May near St-André, Kuttelwascher shot down three He 111s within four minutes.

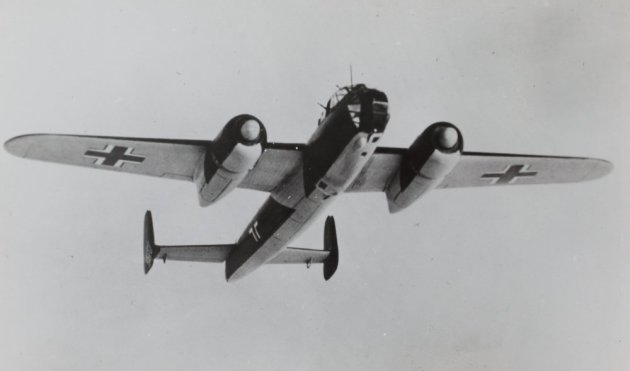
A Dornier Do 217 bomber. Between April and July 1942, Kuttelwascher shot down seven Do 217s and damaged another three.

On the night of 2/3 June, Kuttelwascher shot down a Do 217 off Dunkirk. The next night near St-André, he shot down two He 111s and a Do 217 and damaged a second Do 217. On the night of 21/22 June, again near St-André, he shot down an Ju 88 and damaged a second. On the night of 28/29 June 1942 Kuttelwascher shot down a Do 217E-4 of VII/Kampfgeschwader 2 at Trévières in Normandy, killing all the crew. On the night of 1/2 July near Dinard he shot down two Do 217s and damaged a third.

No. 1 Squadron destroyed 21 enemy aircraft in three months. Of these, Kuttelwascher had shot down 15 and damaged another five. For this he was awarded the Distinguished Flying Cross and news media nicknamed him the Czech Night Hawk.

Kuttelwascher's exploits were a great morale booster for his countrymen back home. Josef Josten, who was looking after the BBC's military services in Czech, arranged for them to be broadcast, including a personal interview.

=== Subsequent RAF service ===
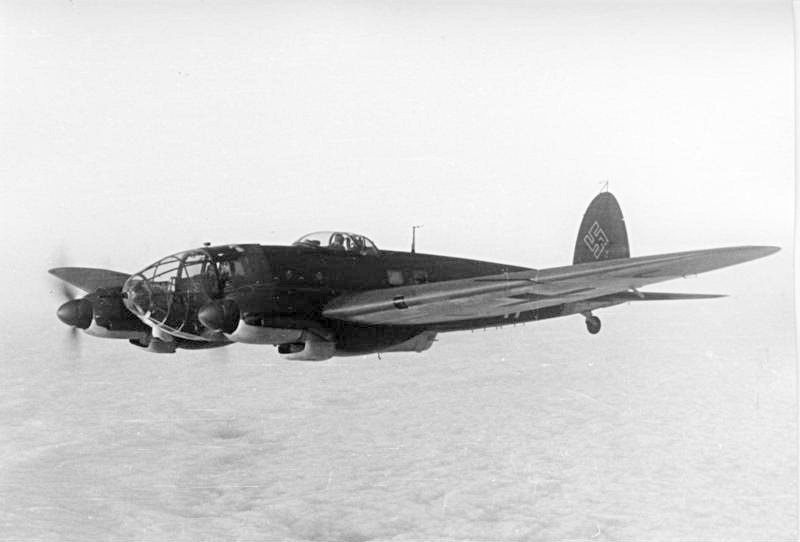
A Heinkel He 111 bomber. Between April and June 1942 Kuttelwascher shot down six He 111s.

On 8 July 1942, Kuttelwascher was assigned to No. 23 Squadron RAF at RAF Ford, not far from Tangmere, to continue night intruder missions. This squadron flew the de Havilland Mosquito Mk II, which was equipped with H2S radar. Kuttelwascher's navigator was P/O GE Palmer. In August and September the pair flew six intruder missions over France and the Netherlands, but did not manage to shoot down any enemy aircraft.

In October 1942, Kuttelwascher was withdrawn from combat flying and transferred to the Czechoslovak Air Inspectorate in London. From June to December 1943, he spent six months in the US and Canada, primarily to try to recruit Czech and Slovak Americans and Canadians to join Czechoslovak units of the UK armed forces. He also gave lectures about the air war in Europe to the United States Army Air Forces and Royal Canadian Air Force.

On his return, Kuttelwascher was posted to No. 32 Maintenance Unit at RAF St Athan in Wales. There he served as a test pilot on various types of bomber until the end of the war.

== Later life ==
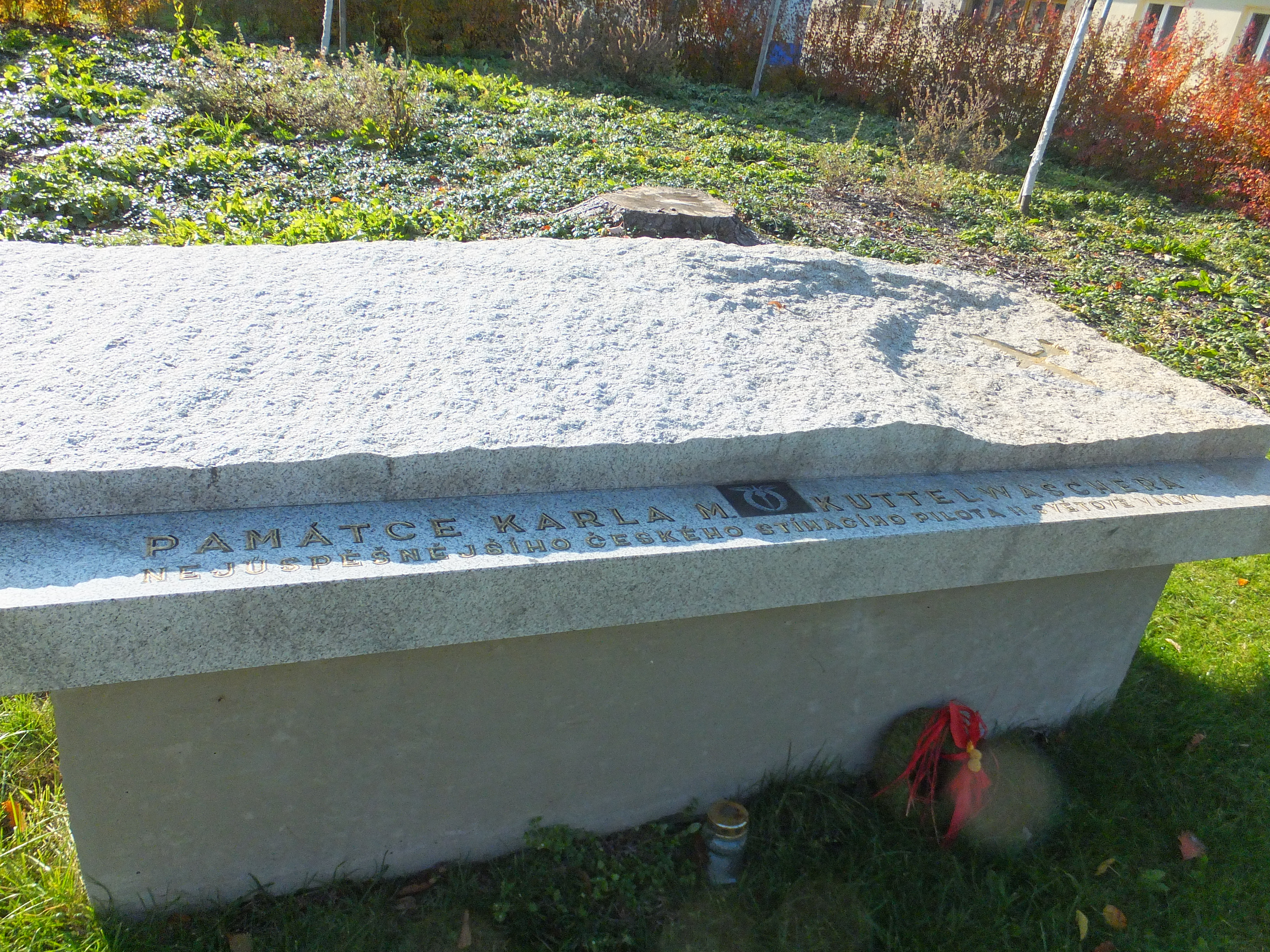
Monument to Kuttelwascher in Svatý Kříž, Havlíčkův Brod, Czech Republic

By the end of the war, Karel and Ruby had a son and twin daughters. Kuttelwascher returned to Czechoslovakia in August 1945, followed shortly after by his wife and children. He transferred back to the Czechoslovak Air Force, was promoted to Staff Captain and was posted to Ruzyně near Prague. A month later, he returned to his former base of Hradec Králové as an instructor at the Air Force Academy there.

Ruby did not adapt to life in Czechoslovakia and Kuttelwascher's air force service there, and in January 1946 she returned to England. Kuttelwascher became concerned about the growing power of the Communist Party of Czechoslovakia under Soviet patronage in the Third Czechoslovak Republic. He applied for a visa to return to the UK, which was eventually granted. On 21 May 1946, he resigned from the air force and five days later, on the day of the Czechoslovak general election, returned to Britain.

Back in the UK, Kuttelwascher initially flew light aircraft to maintain his skills. He then joined British European Airways as a first officer. Karel and Ruby divorced in 1951. In 1955, Kuttelwascher started a greengrocery business, but continued to fly. He became a naturalised UK subject in January 1956. In the same year, he was promoted to captain.

On 13 August 1959, Kuttelwascher was on holiday in St Austell, Cornwall, when he suffered a heart attack. He was admitted to the local hospital, but on the night of 17 August he suffered a fatal second heart attack. He is buried at Uxbridge, Middlesex.

== Achievements and honours ==
Kuttelwascher had 18 confirmed air victories during the war. In 1942 Air Vice-Marshal Karel Janoušek rated him as one of "The greatest figures among our fighter pilots".

Kuttelwascher's true total may have been higher. A number of 20 is often quoted, including aircraft he shot down when in the French Air Force in 1940. Kuttelwascher was the RAF's highest-scoring Czechoslovak pilot, most effective night intruder and sixth-most-successful night fighter. Other RAF night intruder pilots flew mostly radar-equipped aircraft.

=== Awards ===
Kuttelwascher was awarded Czechoslovak, UK and French decorations:

Czechoslovak War Cross 1939–1945 five times
Československá medaile Za chrabrost před nepřítelem ("Bravery in Face of the Enemy")
Československá medaile za zásluhy, 1. stupně ("Medal of Merit, First Class")
Pamětní medaile československé armády v zahraničí ("Commemorative Medal of the Czechoslovak Army Abroad") with France and Great Britain Bars"
Distinguished Flying Cross and bar
1939–1945 Star with Battle of Britain clasp
Air Crew Europe Star
Defence Medal
War Medal 1939–1945
French Croix de Guerre with one palm and one silver star

Posthumously the Czech Republic promoted Kuttelwascher to Brigadier General in 2000 and awarded him the Order of the White Lion in 2016. There are now monuments to him in his home village of Svatý Kříž, and a street named "Kuttelwascherova" after him in the Černý Most suburb of Prague. In 2017, the Czech Mint issued silver and gold commemorative coins (under the authority of Niue) paying tribute to Karel Kuttelwascher.

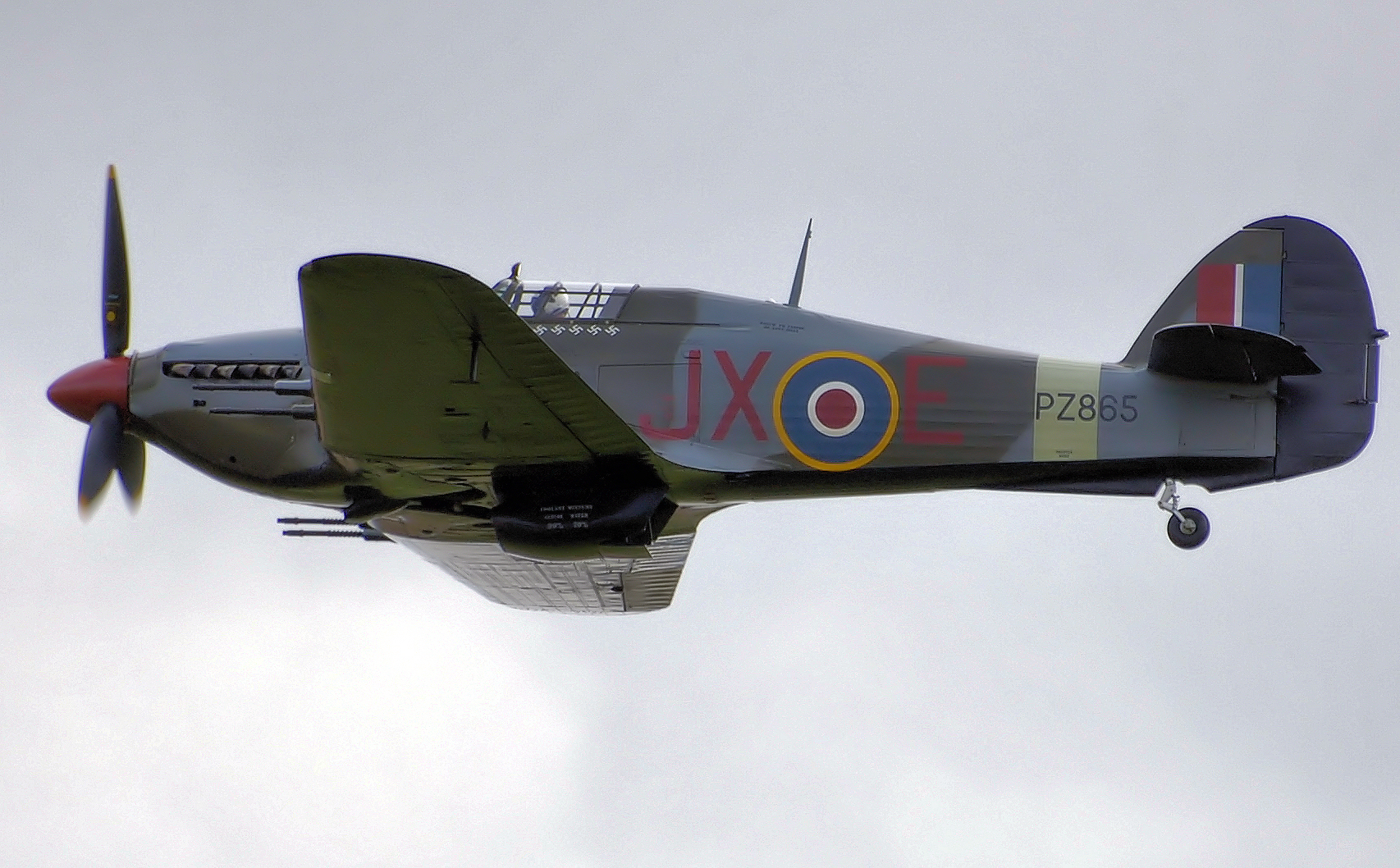
Hawker Hurricane PZ865 in flight bearing the "JX-E" code letters of Kuttelwascher's "Night Reaper" Hurricane IIC BE581

=== Battle of Britain Memorial Flight Hurricane ===
In 2005 the RAF Battle of Britain Memorial Flight at RAF Coningsby in Lincolnshire painted its Hawker Hurricane PZ865 with the "JX-E" code letters in honour of Kuttelwascher and his "Night Reaper" Hurricane BE581.
