= Historic Flying Limited =

British aviation company

The Aircraft Restoration Company (HFL) are located on the Historic Airfield of Duxford, Cambridgeshire

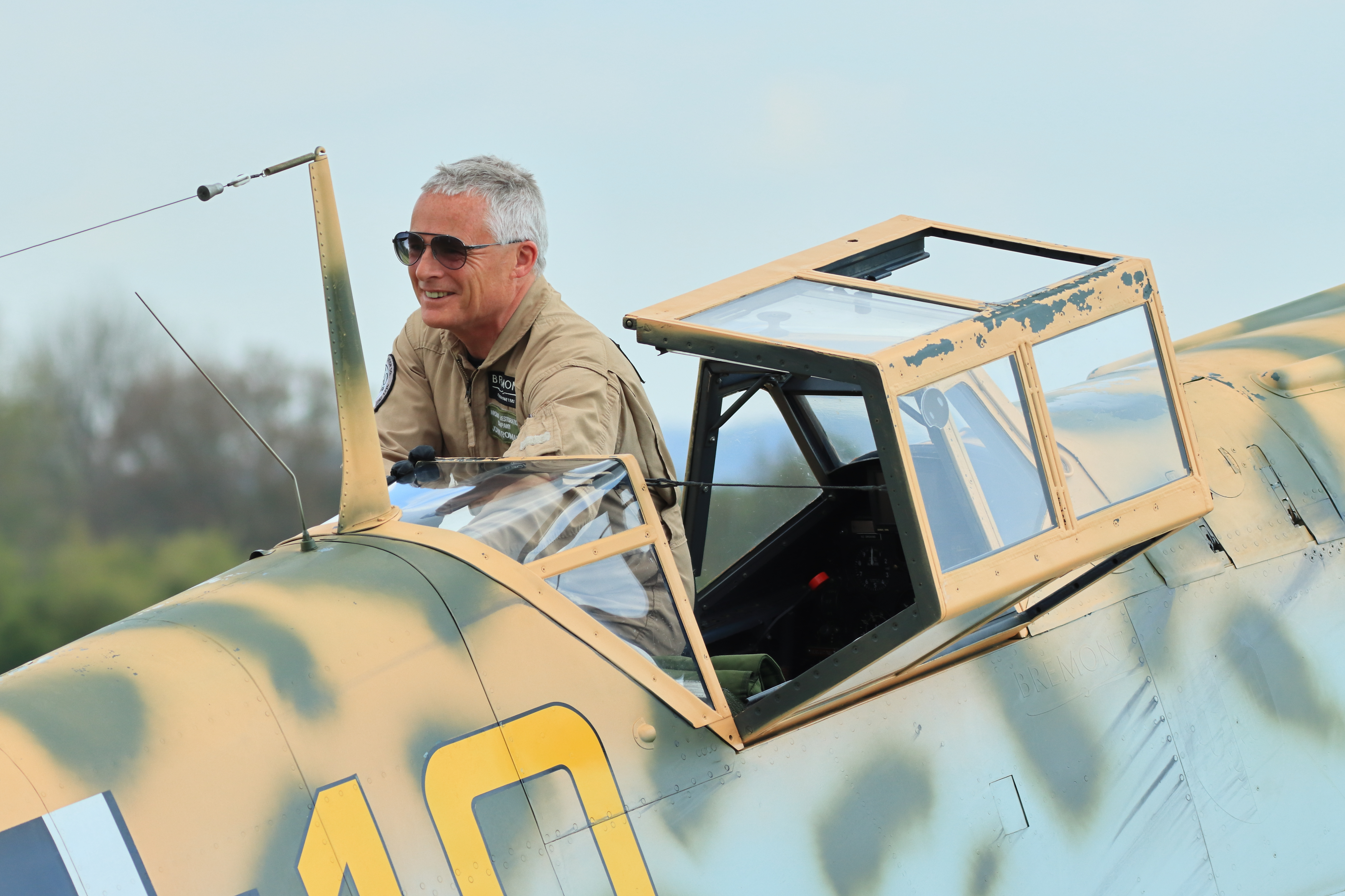
The Aircraft Restoration Company's Managing Director, John Romain MBE.

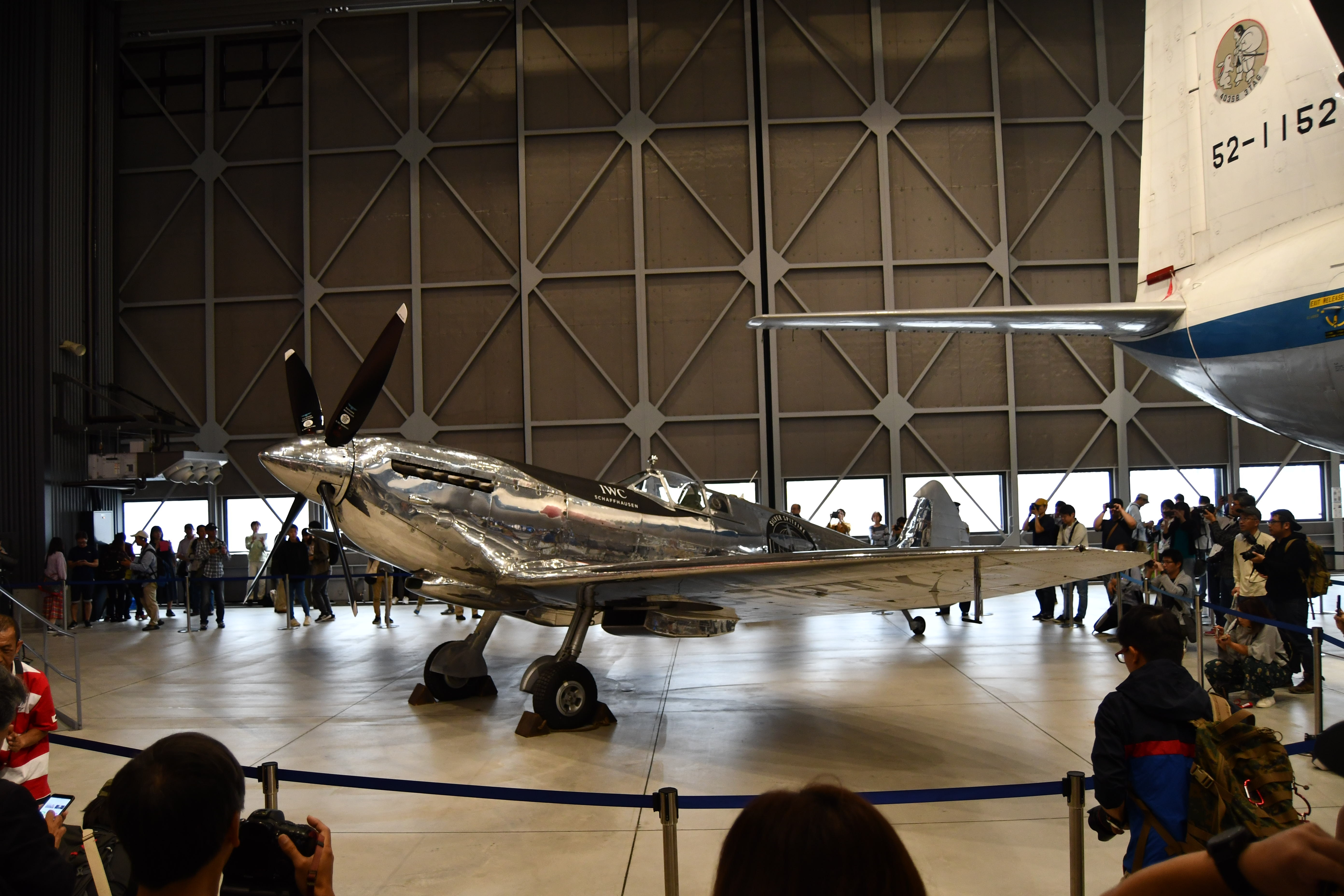
Spitfire Mk IX MJ271 - (G-IRTY) 'The Silver Spitfire' was fully rebuilt by Historic Flying Limited in 2019.

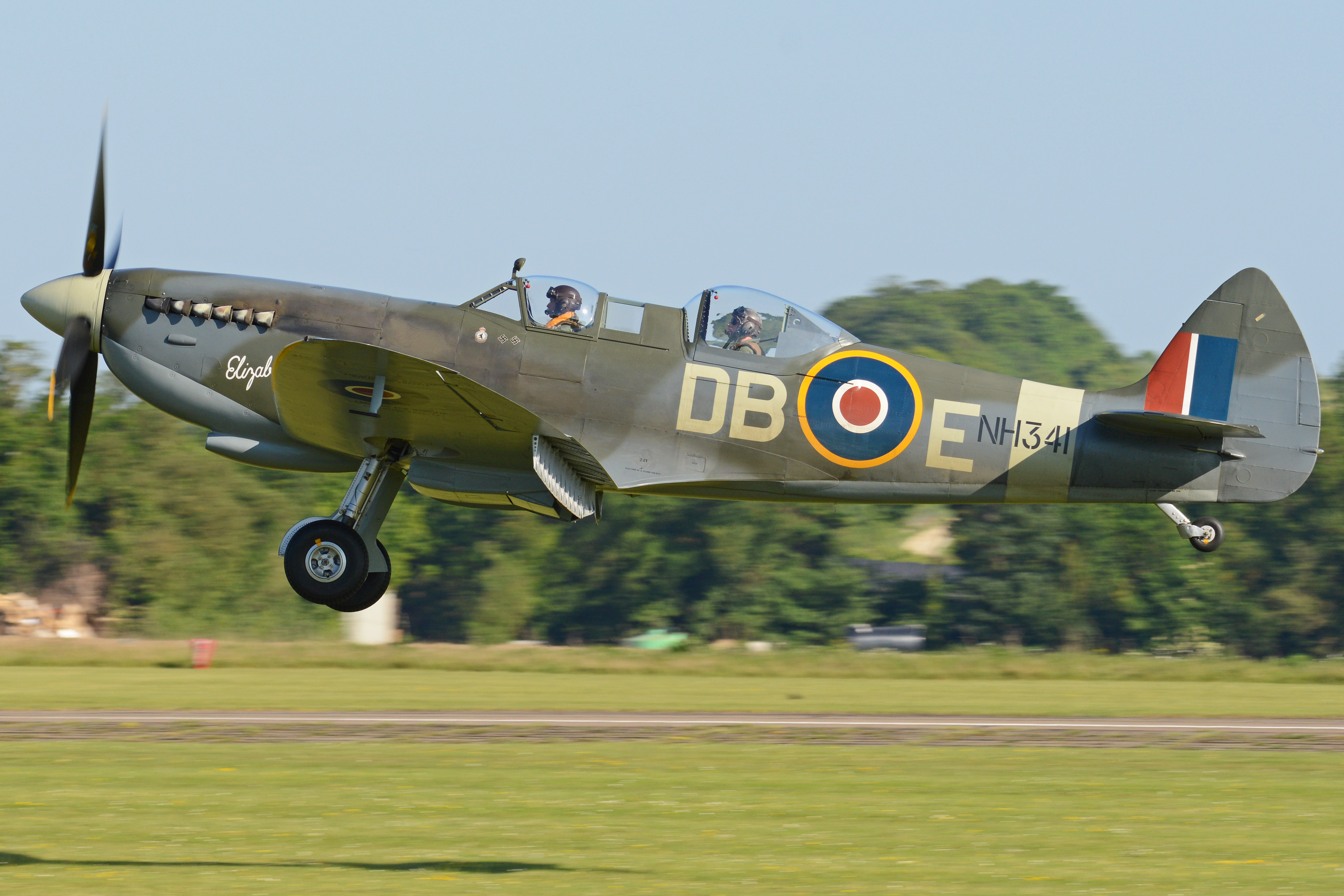
Spitfire Tr.9 NH341 (G-CICK) was restored by Historic Flying Limited in 2017

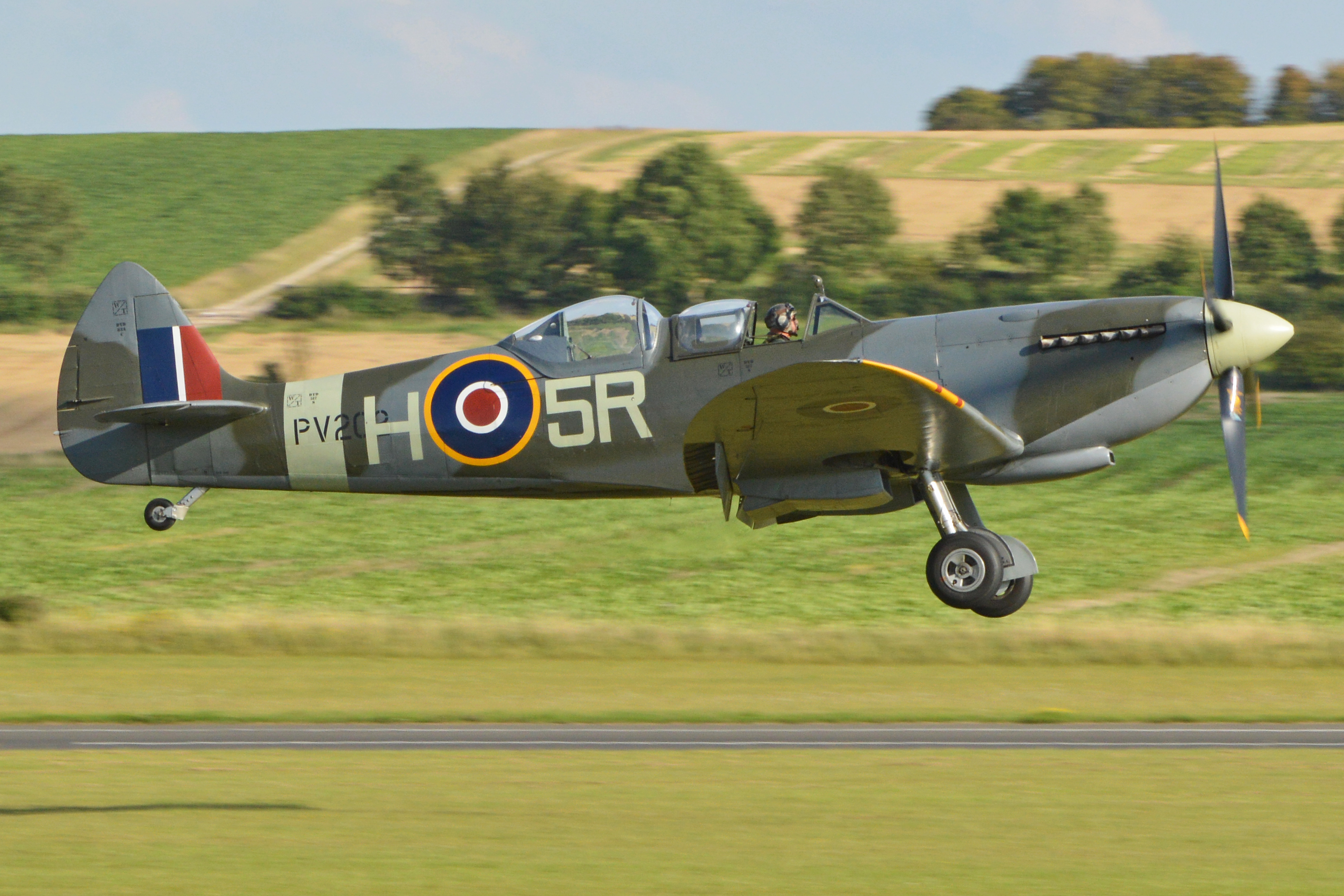
Spitfire Tr.9 PV202 (G-CCCA) restored by Historic Flying Limited in 2005 and now operated by Aerial Collective Duxford.

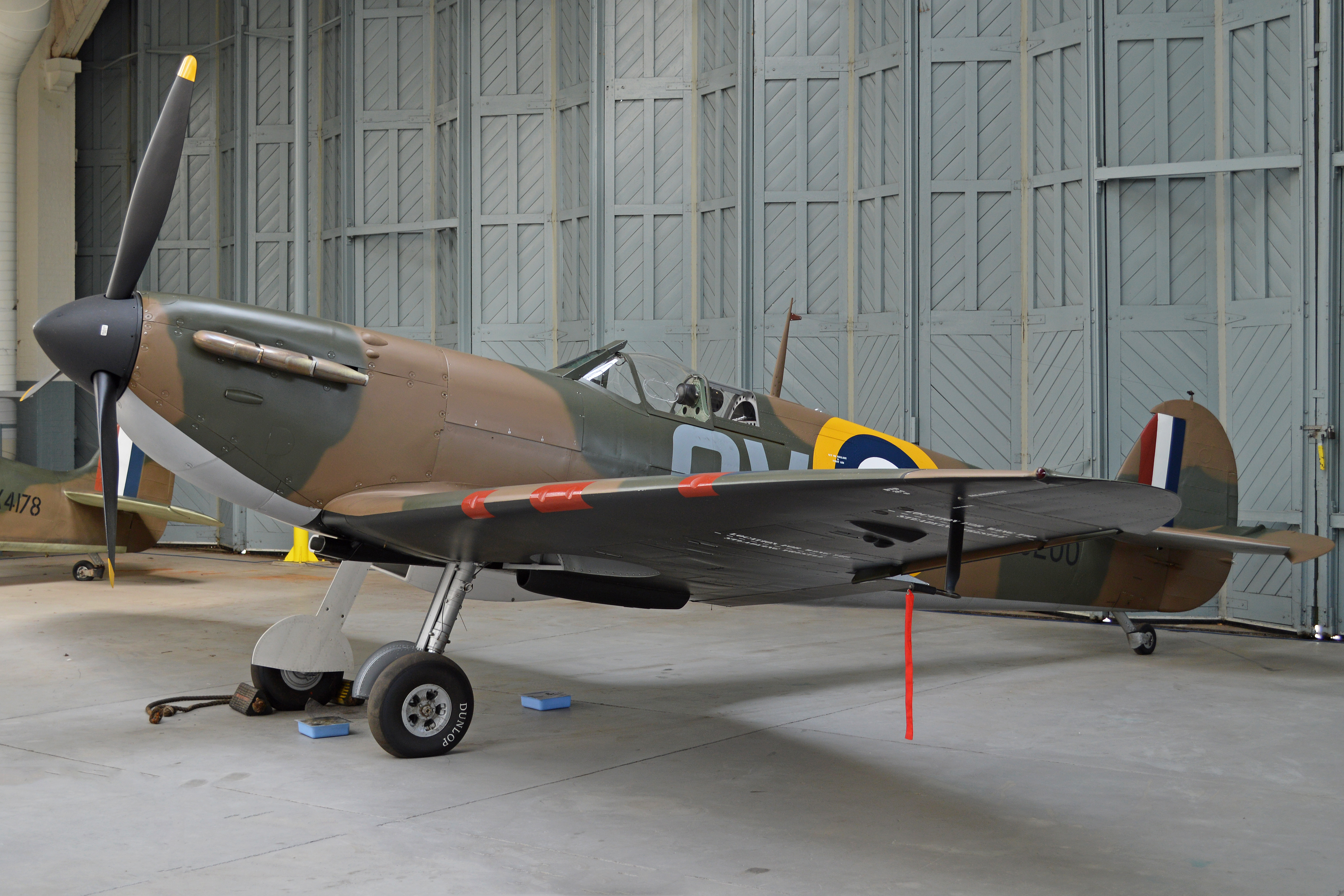
The most authentic Mk Ia Spitfire airworthy today, restored to flight by Historic Flying Limited in 2012.

The Aircraft Restoration Company (formally Historic Flying Limited) is a British company that specialises in the restoration and new-build of Supermarine Spitfires and other historic aircraft. It is based at the former RAF Duxford in Cambridgeshire, England.

The company was founded in the late 1980s to restore five Spitfires to flying condition; these had been "gate guardians" at Royal Air Force stations. Since then, over 30 Spitfires have been restored or built from scratch - using salvaged parts where available - or restored. This is said to be a third of the Spitfires that are now airworthy. The organisation has also completed major maintenance work on the RAF's Battle of Britain Memorial Flight aircraft, for which the Stephenson Hangar was purpose-built. The latest of this work included the minor maintenance of the BBMF's Avro Lancaster which was completed at the end of summer 2021.

The Aircraft Restoration Company operates and maintains the largest number of Spitfires and Hurricanes in the world. ARCo specialises in the major and minor maintenance of the RAF BBMF aircraft, including Avro Lancaster, DC-3 Dakota and De Havilland Chipmunks.

The company now uses its expertise to also offer experience flights in its historic aircraft, through their in-house team Aerial Collective Duxford.

== Completed or on-going work ==
The Aircraft Restoration Company / Historic Flying Limited have returned the following aircraft to the air:

- Spitfire Mk XVI RW382. Full rebuild completed in 1991.
- Spitfire Mk IX TE566. Full rebuild completed in 1992.
- Spitfire Mk XVIII TP280. Full rebuild completed in 1992.
- Spitfire Mk XVI TD248. Full rebuild completed in 1992.
- P-51 Mustang 'Short Fuse Sallee'. Post fire restoration completed in 1994.
- Spitfire Mk XIV NH799. Full rebuild completed in 1994.
- Spitfire Mk XIV SM832. Full rebuild completed in 1995.
- Spitfire Mk Vb EP120. Full rebuild completed in 1995.
- Spitfire Mk Vc AR614. Full rebuild completed in 1996.
- Spitfire Mk Vb AB910. Major overhaul completed in 1997.
- Spitfire Mk XIX PM631. Major overhaul completed in 1997.
- Spitfire Mk Vb BM597. Full rebuild completed in 1997.
- Hurricane IIc LF363. Full rebuild completed in 1998.
- Spitfire Mk XVIII SM845. Full rebuild completed in 2000.
- Spitfire Mk IX MK912. Full rebuild completed in 2000.
- Spitfire Mk XIV RN201. Full rebuild completed in 2002.
- Spitfire Tr.9 IAC-161 / PV202. Full rebuild completed in 2005.
- Spitfire Mk XVI RW386. Full rebuild completed in 2006.
- Spitfire Mk Vc JG891. Full rebuild completed in 2006.
- Spitfire Mk IX PL344. Major overhaul completed in 2007.
- Spitfire Mk IXe SL633. Full rebuild completed in 2010.
- Spitfire Mk Ia P9374. Full rebuild completed in 2012.
- Spitfire Mk XIX PS853. Major overhaul completed in 2012.
- Spitfire Mk Ia N3200. Full rebuild completed in 2014.
- Spitfire Mk XVIII SM845. Major overhaul completed in 2014.
- Spitfire Mk XIX PS915. Major overhaul completed in 2016.
- Spitfire Tr.9 NH341. Full rebuild and type conversion completed in 2017.
- Spitfire PR Mk XI PL983. Full rebuild completed in 2018.
- Lysander V9312. Full rebuild completed in 2018.
- Spitfire Mk IX MJ271 'The Silver Spitfire'. Full rebuild completed in 2019.
- Spitfire PR Mk XIX PS890. Full rebuild, completed in 2020.
- Wildcat FM-2 AX733. Full rebuild, completed 2022.
- Spitfire Mk.IX ML417. Full overhaul completed in 2023.
- Spitfire Tr.9 MJ444. Full rebuild completed 2024.
- Spitfire Tr.9 BS548. Full rebuild completed in 2026.
- Spitfire Tr.9 (unknown identity). Full rebuild expected to be completed in 2026.
- Spitfire Mk1 (unknown identity). Full rebuild, no expected completion date.
- Spitfire Mk.IX PL258. Full rebuild, no expected completion date.
- Hawker Hurricane Mk1 P3966. Full rebuild following transfer of project from Hawker Restorations, no expected completion date.
- Spitfire (Griffon Variant - unknown identity). Full rebuild, no expected completion date
- Hawker Typhoon MkIb RB396. Full rebuild, no expected completion date.
- Focke-Wulf Fw189 (Unknown Identity). Full rebuild, no expected completion date.

== Operated & Maintained Aircraft ==
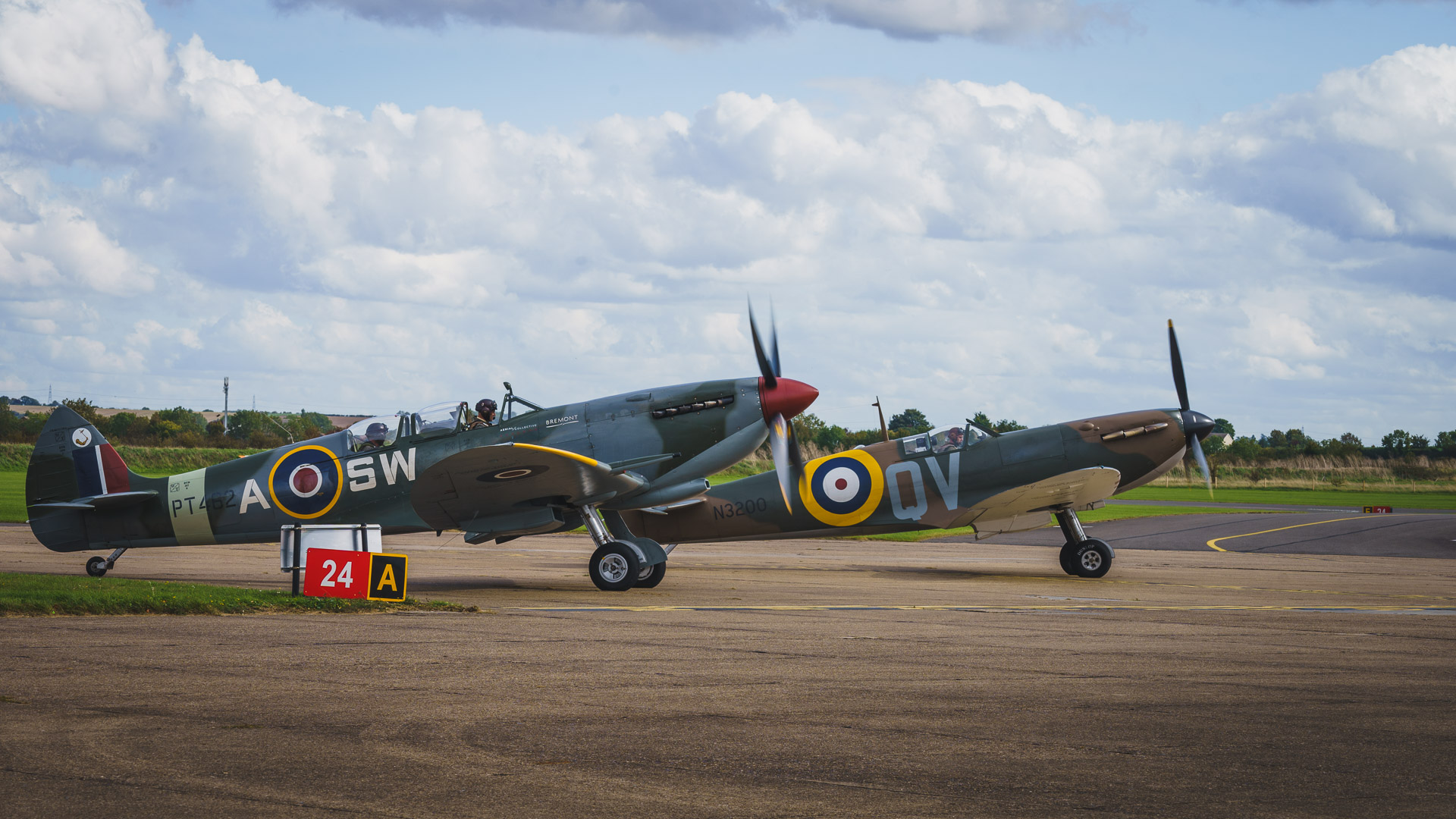
Spitfires N3200 and PT462, operated by the Aircraft Restoration Company from Duxford

The Aircraft Restoration Company currently own, maintain or operate the following warbird aircraft:

- Blenheim Mk1 L6739.
- Spitfire PR Mk XI PL983 aka 'The NHS Spitfire'
- Lysander III V9312.
- Spitfire Tr.9 PV202
- Spitfire Tr.9 PT462.
- Hispano Buchon 'Yellow 10'.
- Harvard T.6 'Taz'.
- DHC-2 Beaver G-DCHZ.
- Spitfire Mk1a N3200 (Owned by Imperial War Museum)
- Spitfire Mk Vc JG891 (Privately Owned)
- Spitfire Mk. IX MH434 (Privately Owned)
- Spitfire Mk. IX ML417 (Privately Owned)
- Spitfire Mk. IX TD314 (Maintenance Only) (Privately Owned)
- Spitfire Mk XVI TD248 (Maintenance Only) (Privately Owned)
- Spitfire Tr.9 NH341 (Maintenance Only) (Privately Owned)
- Spitfire Tr.9 MJ444 (Maintenance Only) (Privately Owned)
- Hurricane Mk1 R4118 (Privately Owned)
- Hurricane Mk1 V7497 (Privately Owned)
- Hurricane MkIIB BE505 (Privately Owned)
- Hurricane MkXII 5711 (Maintenance Only) (Privately Owned)
- P-51D Mustang 'Tall In The Saddle' (Privately Owned)
- Wildcat FM-2 AX733 (Privately Owned)

== NHS Spitfire Project ==
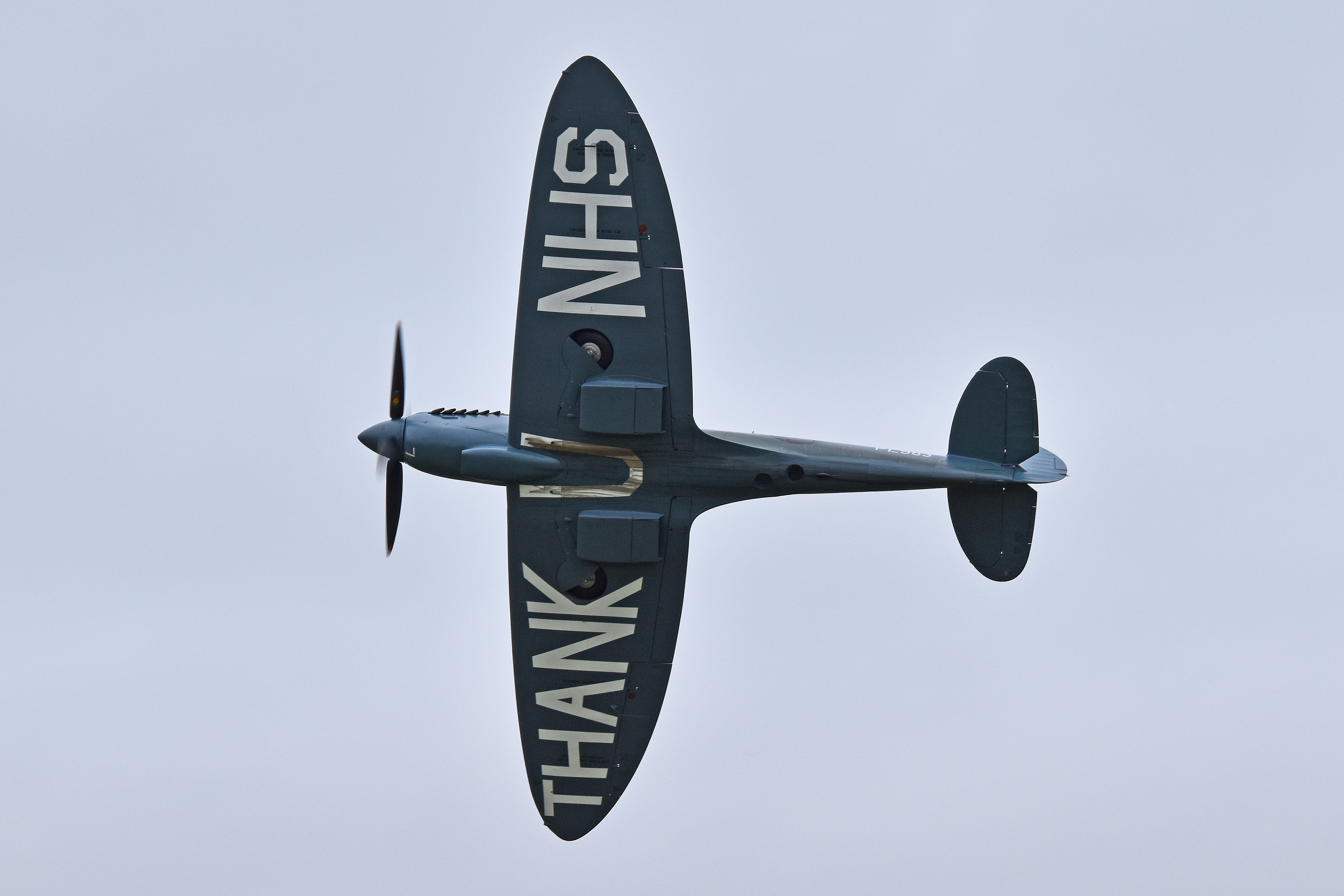
The 'THANK U NHS' Spitfire flew a number of flight routes over NHS & HSC Hospitals in 2020.

In response to the Coronavirus pandemic in 2020, the Aircraft Restoration Company painted the words 'THANK U NHS' on the underside of their Spitfire PR Mk XI PL983 "L". Over the course of 4 months the Spitfire completed a number of flight routes, flying over 250 NHS and HSC sites across the United Kingdom in an effort to thank medical & health workers for their on-going fight against the virus. Simultaneously, the general public was able to donate money to 'The NHS Spitfire' project, with a nominated name from each donation being hand-written onto the Spitfire. As of January 2021, the project has raised over £130,000.00, with all funds going to NHS Charities Together.

== Film work ==
Over the years, the Aircraft Restoration Company has worked or featured on numerous TV and film projects, often providing aircraft, pilots, historical advice and expertise on aerial coordinating.

Works include:

- Guy Martin's Spitfire (2014) Channel 4 documentary covering the two-year restoration of a Mark 1 Spitfire, N3200.
- Dunkirk directed by Christopher Nolan, which included use of the organisation's Bristol Blenheim and Hispano Buchon.
- Valkyrie
- Top Gear
- Memphis Belle
- Dark Blue World
- Mission: Impossible - Dead Reckoning
