= Hawker Hurricane PZ865 =

British airborne memorial fighter plane

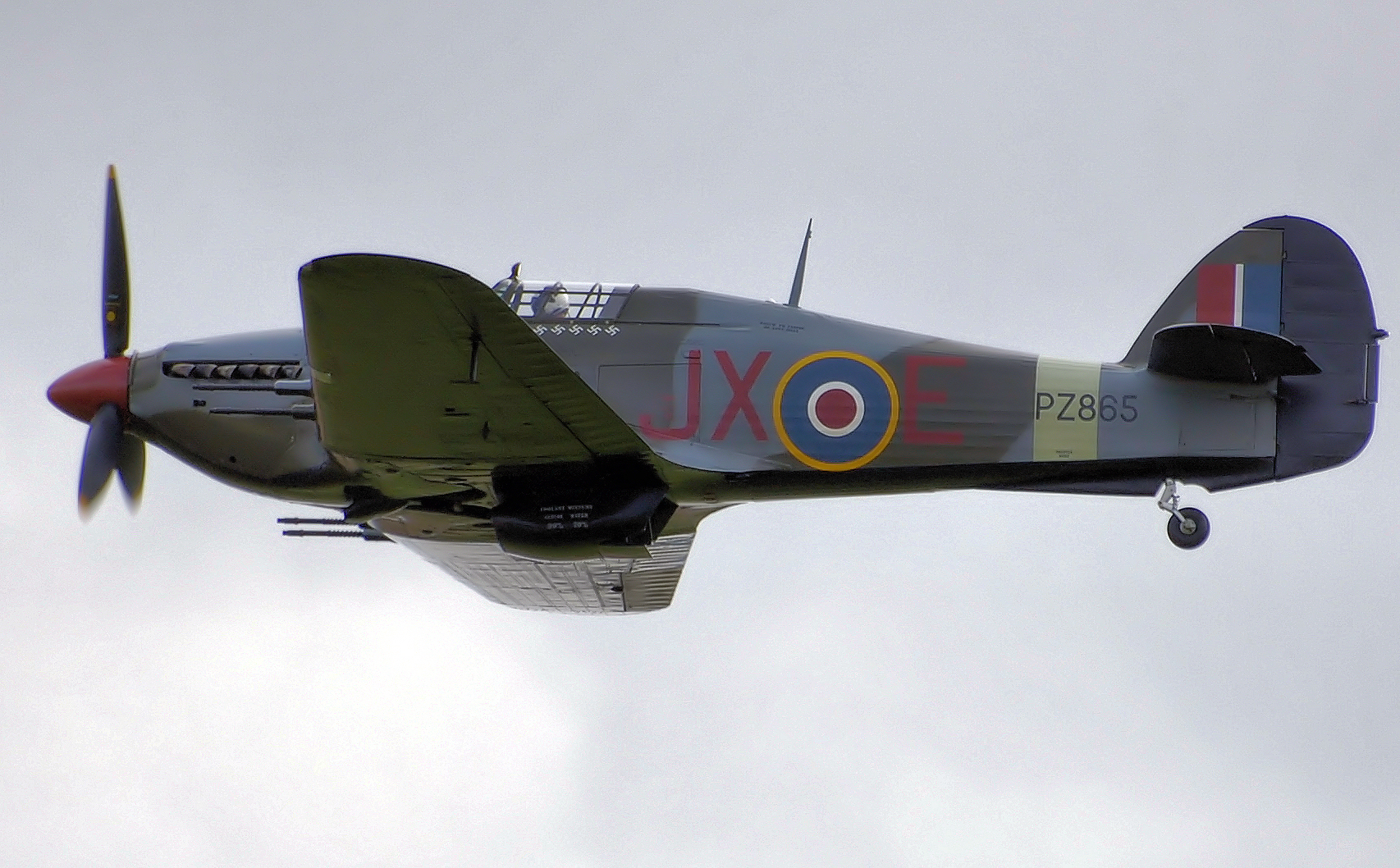
- PZ865 at the Kemble Airfield Open Day, September 2007

General information
- Other name: The Last of the Many
- Type: Hawker Hurricane IIC
- Manufacturer: Hawker Aircraft
- Status: Airworthy
- Owners: Hawker Aircraft Limited (1944-1972); Royal Air Force (1972-)
- Registration: G-AMAU (1950-1972)
- Serial: PZ865 (1944-)

History
- Manufactured: 1944
- First flight: 22 July 1944
- In service: 1944-
- Preserved at: Based at RAF Coningsby

PZ865 is a single-engined Second World War Hawker Hurricane fighter operated by the Royal Air Force Battle of Britain Memorial Flight. It was the last of 14,533 Hurricanes produced and is now flown as an airborne memorial.

== History ==
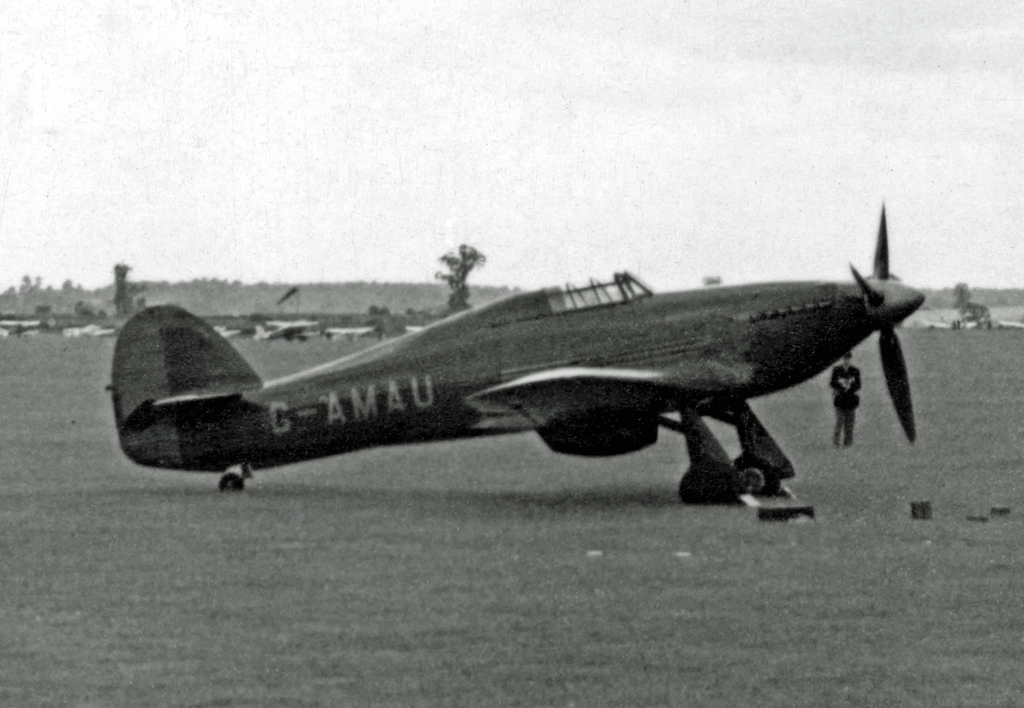
PZ865 in June 1954, when owned by Hawker Aircraft. It is painted in their dark blue colours and marked with its civil registration

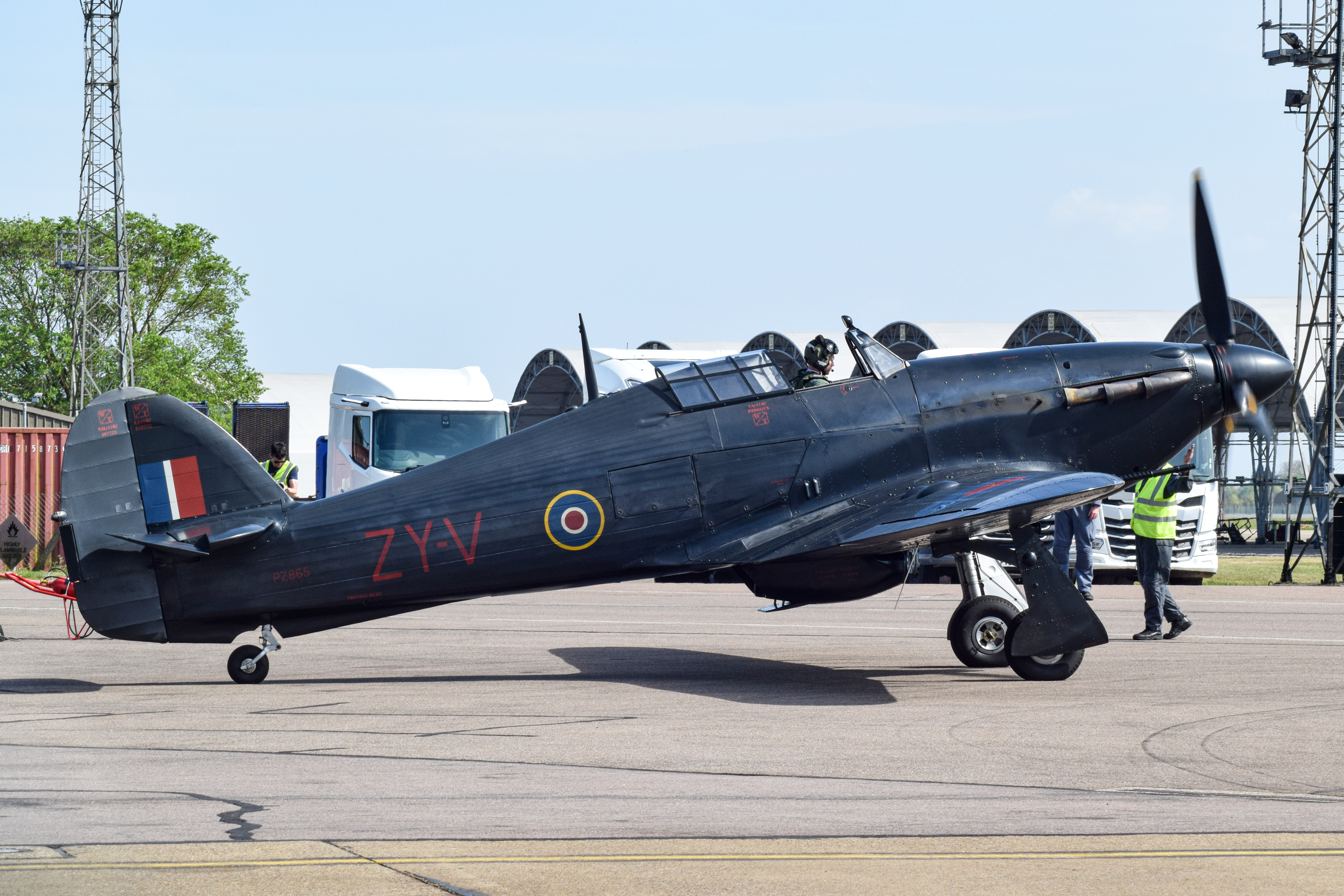
PZ865 in its current markings, RAF Coningsby, May 2026

Named The Last of the Many serial number PZ865 first flew at Langley, Buckinghamshire on 22 July 1944. Instead of being allocated to the RAF, it was retained by its manufacturer, Hawker Aircraft for trials work.

It moved in 1950 to the Hawker factory at Dunsfold Aerodrome and it was given the civil registration G-AMAU on 1 May 1950. It was flown into second place at the 1950 King's Cup Air Race by Group Captain Peter Townsend. At this time it was painted in Hawker Aircraft's dark blue colour scheme with gold lettering and lining. It was used as a chase plane during the P.1127 flight trials. The aircraft also appeared in the Battle of Britain film in 1968.

In 1972 the aircraft was refurbished and presented by Hawker's successor company, Hawker Siddeley, to the Royal Air Force's Battle of Britain Memorial Flight then based at RAF Coltishall, reverting to its RAF serial as identity.

Formerly painted as code JX-E to represent "Night Reaper" flown by 1 Squadron fighter ace Flt Lt Karel Kuttelwascher DFC during night intruder operations from RAF Tangmere, In 2010 the Battle of Britain Memorial Flight began a rebuild of Hawker Hurricane PZ865 wearing a new colour scheme, faithfully replicating Hurricane Mk IIC HW840, coded ‘EG-S’, of 34 Squadron, South East Asia Command during 1944, the personal aircraft of Canadian pilot, Flight Lieutenant Jimmy Whalen DFC. In 2020 PZ865's livery was again changed, this time painted all black with the codes ZY-V, representing 247 night fighter squadron.
