= List of surviving Avro Lancasters =

The Avro Lancaster is a British four-engine heavy bomber used by the Royal Air Force and other Commonwealth air forces during World War II. Of the 7,377 aircraft built, 3,736 were lost during the war (3,249 in action and 487 in ground accidents). Today 17 remain in complete form: two are airworthy, and two others are in taxiable condition with working engines. Of the preserved airframes, eight are preserved in Canada, where some Lancasters were converted and used for Cold War maritime patrols until 1964. Only four of the preserved 17 – KB839, KB882, R5868, and W4783 – flew operational sorties over Continental Europe during the War.

== Preserved aircraft ==
=== Australia ===
Serial	Geographic location	Institutional location	Status	History
W4783	(Australia) Canberra	Australian War Memorial	Static display	Built by Metropolitan-Vickers in Manchester as Mk. I. Assigned to 460 Squadron 22 October 1942 as AR-G "G for George". Flew first sortie 6 December 1942, and eighty-ninth and final sortie 20 April 1944. Flown to Australia 11 October 1944 and arrived 8 November in Brisbane. Flown in Eastern Australia in 1945 as part of Third Victory Loan Drive. Left at RAAF Base Fairbairn until 1955. Moved to AWM in 1950s. Repainted in 1978. Removed from display in 1999 and given full restoration at AWM's Treloar Technology Centre. Put back on display in ANZAC Hall in December 2003.
	Bull Creek, Western Australia	Aviation Heritage Museum	Static display	Built by Austin Motors in Birmingham as Mk. VII. One of 22 Lancasters sold in April 1952 to French Aéronautique navale. Used until 1962. Donated to RAAF Association in 1962. Wears livery of LL847, which was shot down 18 December 1944.

=== Canada ===
Serial	Geographic location	Institutional location	Status	History
FM104	(Canada) Sidney, British Columbia	British Columbia Aviation Museum	Under restoration for display	Built at Victory Aircraft in Malton, Ontario as Mk. X. Flown to England in January 1945. Kept in reserve at No. 32 Maintenance Unit for 408 Squadron RCAF and 428 Squadron. Returned to Canada 10 June 1945 in expectation of use with Tiger Force against Japanese. Converted in November 1945 to Mk.10SR and assigned to No. 10 RU at Naval Station Argentia. Converted to Mk.10MR in April 1951 and assigned to 107 Unit at RCAF Torbay. Struck off 10 February 1964. Displayed at Canadian National Exhibition in 1964. Purchased by RCAF Association and put on display in Coronation Park in 1965. Ownership transferred to Heritage Toronto in 1990. Moved to Toronto Aerospace Museum (later the Canadian Air and Space Museum) in 1999. Following the museum's closure in 2011, the plane went into storage. In June 2018 obtained by the British Columbia Aviation Museum. Will be restored to static display in post-war Maritime Command configuration. Restoration to be carried out by the museum in conjunction with Victoria Air Maintenance Ltd.
FM136	(Canada) Calgary, Alberta	The Hangar Flight Museum	Static display	"Lady Orchid," built at Victory Aircraft in Malton, Ontario as Mk. X. Flown to England June 1945 but returned to Canada 29 August 1945. Served as RCAF Maritime Reconnaissance plane with 404 Squadron at RCAF Greenwood and 407 Squadron at RCAF Comox. Flown to RCAF Fort Macleod in 1961 for scrap. Purchased in 1961 by Lynn Garrison and put on display in 1962 at entrance of Calgary Municipal Airport as a memorial to those who trained under the British Commonwealth Air Training Plan. Transferred to Calgary Aerospace Museum in 1992. Wears livery of KB895, which flown by Calgary's Ronnie Jenkins.
FM159	(Canada) Nanton, Alberta	Bomber Command Museum of Canada	Static display, working engines, taxiable condition	Built at Victory Aircraft in Malton, Ontario as Mk. X. Flown to England in May 1945 and returned to Canada in September 1945. Served as RCAF Maritime Reconnaissance plane from 1953 to 1958 with 103 Squadron at RCAF Greenwood and 407 Squadron at RCAF Comox. Flown to RCAF Vulcan in 1960 for scrapping. Purchased that year and moved to Nanton, Alberta for display. Has undergone gradual restoration since the formation of the Nanton Lancaster Society in 1986. All four engines now run and the aircraft is taxiable. Most crew station equipment has been restored. Flaps, rear turret and bomb bay doors are operational. Wears livery of ND811 in honour of Ian Bazalgette VC.
FM212	(Canada) Windsor, Ontario	Canadian Aviation Museum	Under restoration for display	Built at Victory Aircraft in Malton, Ontario as Mk. X in July 1945. Returned to factory, by then owned by Avro Canada, in 1948 and converted to Mk.10P. Served with 9 Squadron, 418 Squadron, and 408 Squadron. Struck off 9 October 1964. Stored for a few months at RCAF Dunnville before sold to City of Windsor, Ontario and moved on barge. Placed on display on plinth in Jackson Park until 2005, when removed due to long exposure to elements. As of June 2023, still undergoing restoration through arrangement with Canadian Aviation Museum, with expected completion and return to static display/taxi condition in 2026.
FM213	(Canada) Hamilton, Ontario	Canadian Warplane Heritage Museum	Airworthy	Built at Victory Aircraft in Malton, Ontario as Mk. X. Stored in Trenton, Ontario from 1945 to 1950. Converted to Mk.10MR by de Havilland Canada. Served with 405 Squadron at RCAF Greenwood and 107 Rescue Unit at RCAF Torbay. Struck off 30 June 1964. Stored at RCAF Dunnville. Purchased by and displayed at Royal Canadian Legion in Goderich, Ontario. Purchased by Canadian Warplane Museum and moved to Hamilton in November 1979. After restoration, flown for first time on 11 September 1988. Wears livery of KB726 of 419 Squadron in honour of Andrew Mynarski VC. Along with PA474 one of only two airworthy Lancasters.
KB839	(Canada) Greenwood, Nova Scotia	Greenwood Military Aviation Museum	Static display	Built at Victory Aircraft in Malton, Ontario as Mk. X. Flown to England 1 January 1945. Assigned to 431 Squadron as SE-G, and then to 419 Squadron as VR-D "D Daisy". Flew 26 sorties. Returned to Canada 5 June 1945. Sent to Avro Canada and converted to Mk.XAR. Served with 405 Squadron and 408 Squadron until 1961. Stored at RCAF Dunnville. Flown to Greenwood, Nova Scotia in 1964 and mounted on pedestal. Later transferred to Military Aviation Museum. Wears livery of JB226 of 405 Squadron, which was lost 18 November 1943.
KB882	(Canada) Trenton, Ontario	National Air Force Museum of Canada	Static display	Built at Victory Aircraft in Malton, Ontario as Mk. X. Flown to England in 24 February 1945. Assigned to 431 Squadron without code, and then to 428 Squadron as NA-R "Rabbit Stew". Flew 19 sorties. Returned to Canada 2 June 1945. Stored in Alberta. Sent to Avro Canada in 1952 and converted to Mk.10P. Served with 408 Squadron at RCAF Rockcliffe. Struck off 26 May 1964. Purchased in 1964 by City of Edmundston, New Brunswick. Ownership transferred to National Air Force Museum in Trenton, Ontario. Was moved in September 2017. Restoration work finished in spring of 2024, displayed as a post-War Mk.10AR.
KB944	(Canada) Ottawa, Ontario	Canada Aviation and Space Museum	Static display	Built at Victory Aircraft in Malton, Ontario as Mk. X. Flown to England 8 March 1945 as Mk. X. Assigned to 425 Squadron as KW-K. Did not fly any sorties and returned to Canada 15 June 1945. Stored at BCATP Fort Macleod. Converted to Mk.10S by Fairey Aviation, Eastern Passage, Nova Scotia. Served with 404 Squadron at RCAF Greenwood. Struck off January 1957. Stored at RCAF Dunnville. Restored by RCAF. Purchased by National Aviation Museum in May 1964. Wears livery of KB760 of 428 Squadron.

=== France ===
Serial	Geographic location	Institutional location	Status	History
NX664	(France) Paris	Musée de l'air et de l'espace	Under restoration for display	Built by Austin Motors in Birmingham as Mk. VII. Stored at Llandow after the war. One of 22 Lancasters sold in April 1952 to Aéronautique navale. Crash landed at Mata Utu, Wallis and Futuna in 1963. Recovered by Ailes Anciennes in 1984. Currently undergoing full restoration in concert with NX611. Will wear French livery.

=== New Zealand ===
Serial	Geographic location	Institutional location	Status	History
NX665	(New Zealand) Auckland	Museum of Transport and Technology	Static display	Built by Austin Motors in Birmingham as Mk. VII. One of 22 Lancasters sold in April 1952 to Aéronautique navale. Used until 1964. Placed on display in Auckland in 1964. Acquired in 1978 by MOTAT. Moved indoors in 1980s.

=== United Kingdom ===
Serial	Geographic location	Institutional location	Status	History
R5868	(United Kingdom) London	Royal Air Force Museum London	Static display	Built by Metropolitan-Vickers in Manchester as Mk. I. Delivered to 83 Squadron, RAF Scampton, 29 June 1942 as OL-Q "Queen". Transferred to the Australian 467 Squadron September 1943 as PO-S "Sugar". Completed 137 combat sorties and then participated in food supply and POW repatriation (Operation Exodus). Marked as "non-effective" but kept in storage as being of particular note due to the number of missions completed. Struck off 16 March 1956 and transferred to Air Historical Branch. Sent to RAF Fulbeck in 1958 for storage. In April 1959 moved to RAF Scampton for display. Painted in 83 Squadron markings in 1960. Remained Gate Guardian at Scampton until allotted to RAF Museum in August 1970. Following restoration moved to Hendon in March 1972 and repainted with 467 markings. Moved to new Bomber Command Museum hall at Hendon in August 1982.
KB889	(United Kingdom) Duxford, Cambridgeshire	Imperial War Museum Duxford	Static display	Built at Victory Aircraft in Malton, Ontario as Mk. X. Flown to England 3 January 1945. Assigned to 428 Squadron as NA-I. Did not fly any sorties and returned to Canada 4 June 1945. Converted to Mk.10P by Avro Canada. Served with 408 Squadron at RCAF Torbay. Struck off 21 May 1965. Sold to Age of Flight in Niagara Falls, Ontario in May 1964 and put on display at Niagara Falls Museum in 1965. Sold to Ken Short in 1968. Was transported to the airport at Oshawa, Ontario and reassembled in 1969-70. Purchased by Douglas Arnold and sent to England in 1984. Restored using parts from Avro Lincoln RF342. Sold to Imperial War Museum in 1986. Went on display in November 1994. Wears original livery.
NX611	(United Kingdom) East Kirkby, Lincolnshire	Lincolnshire Aviation Heritage Centre	Taxiable condition; under restoration to airworthiness	Built by Austin Motors in Birmingham as Mk. VII. Stored at RAF Llandow after War. One of 22 Lancasters sold in April 1952 to French Aéronautique navale. Sent to Nouméa, New Caledonia in 1962. Given by French to Historical Aircraft Preservation Society in 1964. After overhaul in Sydney, arrived at Biggin Hill 13 May 1965. Moved to Lavenham in Suffolk and sold to Rt Hon Lord Lilford in 1972. It was the gate guardian of RAF Scampton replacing R5868. Purchased by Fred and Harold Panton in September 1983. Restoration underway to airworthy status.
PA474	(United Kingdom) Coningsby, Lincolnshire	RAF Coningsby	Airworthy	Built at Vickers-Armstrongs's Broughton shadow factory as Mk. I. Placed in storage after War. Assigned to 82 Squadron in 1948 as photo reconnaissance plane in Africa. Loaned to Flight Refuelling Ltd. in August 1952, and College of Aeronautics at Cranfield in late 1952. Passed to Air Historical Branch in 1964. Restored at RAF Waddington and transferred to Battle of Britain Memorial Flight in 1973. New spar in 1995. Along with FM213, one of only two airworthy Lancasters in the world.

=== United States ===
Serial	Geographic location	Institutional location	Status	History
KB976	(United States) Polk City, Florida	Fantasy of Flight	Dismantled and in storage	Built by Victory Aircraft in Malton, Ontario as Mk. X. Flown to England 24 May 1945. Assigned to 405 Squadron as LQ-K. Did not fly any sorties. Returned to Canada 17 June 1945. Converted to Mk.10AR. Served with 408 Squadron. Struck off 26 May 1964. Purchased in April 1964 by Lynn Garrison of Calgary, Alberta. Sold in 1969 to Northwestern Air Lease Ltd (Terry Harrold) and used as water bomber in St. Albert, Alberta. Purchased in September 1974 by Sir William J.D. Roberts and flown to Scotland in June 1975. Damaged in hangar collapse, August 1987. Sold in 1993 to Kermit Weeks and placed in storage at Fantasy of Flight, Polk City, Florida. The mid-rear section, with damage, was sold to the Australian Avro Lincoln project for potential restoration of an Avro Lincoln (which were based on the Lancaster), for static display at the Australian National Aviation Museum.

== Wrecks ==
In addition to the 17 complete surviving planes, there are a small number of known complete or near-complete Lancaster wrecks.

Serial	Location	Coordinates	History	Photo
DV202	Germany	54.146389°N 13.777500°E	Built by Metropolitan-Vickers as Mk.III. Served with 44 Squadron as KM-Z. Shot down by night fighter using Schräge Musik upward firing cannon during the 17/18 August 1943 Operation Hydra raid against the Peenemünde Army Research Center (which was developing V-weapons) and crashed in the small lake Kolpiensee in the target area. The wreckage remains undisturbed and visible just short of the threshold of Peenemünde Airfield. Some parts, including an engine, were recovered and are on display at the Historisch-Technisches Museum Peenemünde.	
FM221	Canada	74.707740°N 94.976978°W	Built by Victory Aircraft in Malton, Ontario as Mk. X. Crashed on takeoff in 1950. Wreckage remains in situ but has severely deteriorated due to a combination of extreme weather, souvenir hunters and bulldozing of the wreckage after the crash.	
KB965	Canada	82.496345°N 62.372146°W	Flown to England and issued to 405(B) Squadron RCAF, returned to Canada on 17 June 1945. Crashed on 31 July 1950 during the establishment of the weather station at Alert, Nunavut, killing all 9 on board. The tail of the aircraft along with much of the wing and all four engines is visible today 500 m (1,600 ft) south of the main station complex.	
KB999	Canada	61.2333°N 95.4833°W (approx.)	Built by Victory Aircraft in Malton, Ontario as Mk. X. It was the 300th Canadian-built Lancaster and the final build of the first order of Victory planes. At the factory the plane was named "Malton Mike" after Air Vice Marshal Clifford "Black Mike" McEwen, and given nose art by Albert "Muff" Mills. Flown to England and assigned to 419 Squadron RCAF as VR-M. Did not fly any sorties. Reassigned to 405 Squadron RCAF as LQ-M for return to Canada that June. In 1950 converted to Mk. 10MR. On 22 August 1953 flew with 408 Squadron from RCAF Rockcliffe to HMC NRS Churchill, but after getting lost during an electrical storm ditched in a lake west of what is now Arviat, Nunavut. Wreck remains in situ but has been broken up by ice action.	
NF920	Sweden	67.008722°N 19.729083°E	Built by Armstrong Whitworth as Mk. I. Served with 617 Squadron as KC-E. It was damaged by flak attacking the German battleship Tirpitz during Operation Obviate in October 1944 and was forced to make an emergency landing near Porjus in Norrbottens län in the north of Sweden. The crew unsuccessfully attempted to burn the aircraft; the wreckage still lies in situ. NF920 is the only surviving Lancaster to have flown with 617 "Dambusters" Squadron. A group is currently raising funds to recover the wreckage from its site and return the plane to Britain.	
