= Evesham River Festival =

Festival on the River Avon in England

Evesham River Festival started in 1986 and is held in Workman Gardens, Evesham, on the banks of and in the River Avon. The festival is usually arranged for mid-July. The festival consists of visiting fancily-dressed boats, often decoratively illuminated, waterways skill demonstrations/competitions, and various events and entertainments for both the boaters and visiting members of the public. These events have included Douglas DC-3 flybys from the Battle of Britain Memorial Flight, morris men, and live music.
