= Canadian Warplane Heritage Museum =

Aviation museum in Hamilton, Ontario, Canada

- Location within Ontario
- Location: John C. Munro International Airport in Mount Hope, Ontario
- Coordinates: 43°09′35″N 079°55′30″W
- Type: Military aviation museum
- Founders: Dennis Bradley; Peter Matthews; Alan Ness; John Weir
- Website: warplane.com

The Canadian Warplane Heritage Museum is an aviation museum located at the John C. Munro Hamilton International Airport in Mount Hope, Ontario, Canada. The museum has 47 military jets and propeller-driven aircraft on display.

Displayed is a collection of Canadian military aircraft, many in flying condition. The museum is also restoring several Second World War and Cold War aircraft, including a De Havilland Canada built S-2 Tracker and a Bristol Bolingbroke. The flying collection performs at air shows and is made available for local flights by museum visitors.

The Avro Lancaster flown by the museum is one of only two airworthy Lancasters in the world. Known as the Mynarski Memorial Lancaster in honour of Pilot Officer Andrew Charles Mynarski, it is painted in the markings of his aircraft.

== History ==
After pooling their money to purchase a Fairey Firefly, Dennis Bradley, Peter Matthews, Alan Ness, and John Weir moved the aircraft into Hangar 4 at Hamilton Airport in 1972. A few years later, the museum purchased a second hangar, Hangar 3, as well. The collection was expanded with the acquisition of additional aircraft – including a B-25 in 1975 and a Lancaster in 1977. However, that same year Alan Ness was killed in the crash of a Fairey Firefly at the Canadian International Air Show.

On February 15, 1993, a fire destroyed most of Hangar #3. Destroyed in the fire were also the Hawker Hurricane, General Motors TBM Avenger, Auster, Stinson 105 and Supermarine Spitfire. A new, purpose built hangar was completed in 1996 to replace it.

In August and September 2014, the Mynarski Memorial Lancaster Bomber flew across the North Atlantic to RAF Coningsby to participate in six weeks of airshows and events across the United Kingdom. Unique to this tour, the Lancaster VeRA (as it became known due to its wartime VR-A markings) flew in close formation with the Royal Air Force – Battle of Britain Memorial Flight's Lancaster bomber PA474 for most of the 60 displays and events over the two months of the tour. Lancaster VeRA returned to Hamilton on September 29, 2014.

== Collection ==
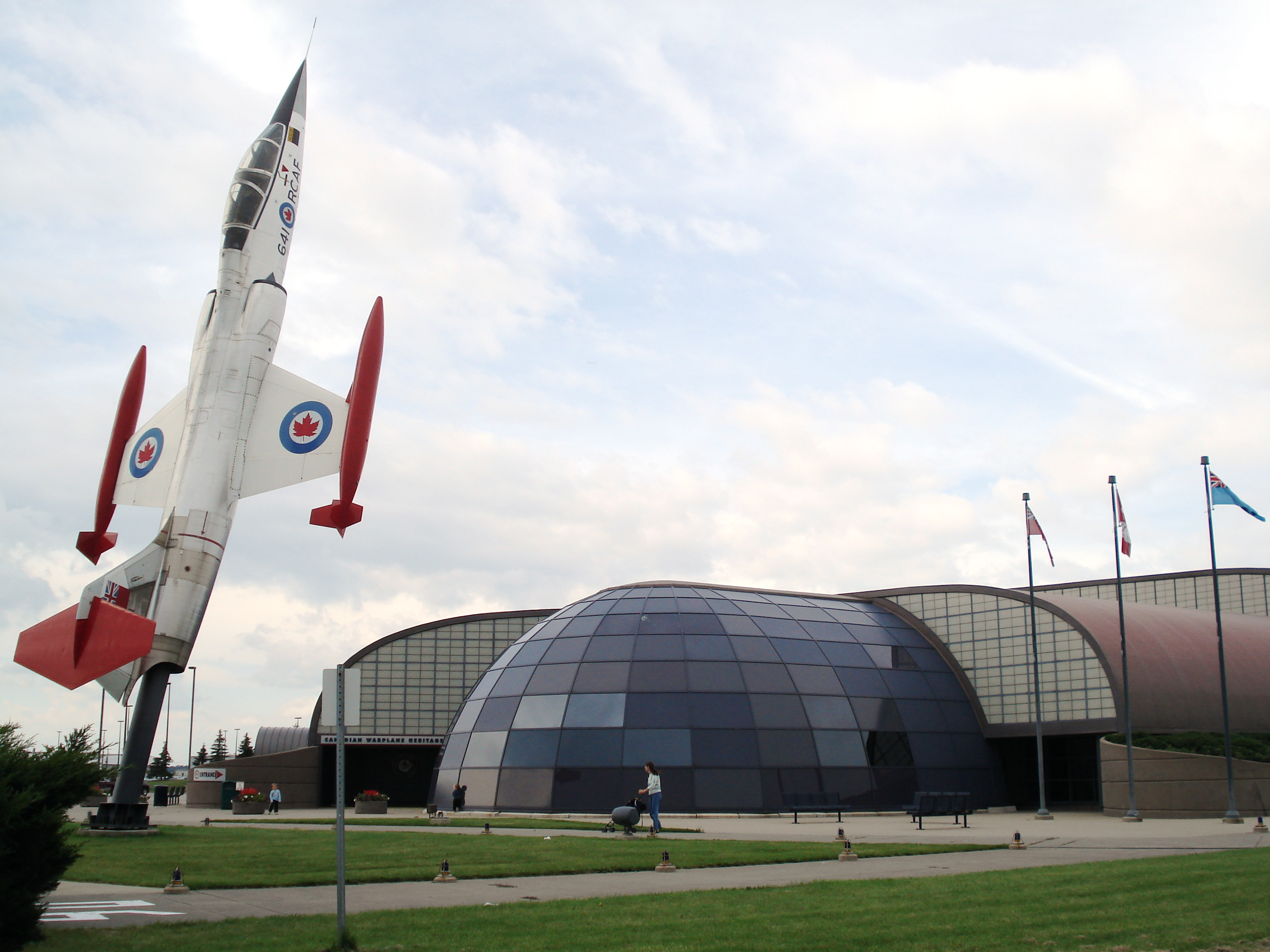
CF-104 Starfighter

As of February 2023, Transport Canada and the museum lists the following aircraft in its database and operate as ICAO airline designator CWH, and telephony WARPLANE HERITAGE.

- Auster AOP.6 16681
- Avro Anson V 12417
- Avro Lancaster X FM213
- Avro Canada CF-100 Canuck Mk.5D 18785
- Beechcraft CT-134 Musketeer 134222
- Beechcraft D18S A-0156
- Beechcraft V35
- Boeing Stearman PT-17 Kaydet 41-8621
- Canadair CF-5A Freedom Fighter 116757
- Canadair CF-104D Starfighter 12641
- Canadair CF-104 Starfighter 12790
- Canadair CT-114 Tutor 26038
- Canadair CT-133 Silver Star 21275
- Canadair Sabre Mk.6 23651
- Canadian Vickers Canso 11084
- Cessna L-19 Bird Dog 21085
- Cessna Crane I 7862
- de Havilland DHC-1B Chipmunk 18035
- de Havilland DHC-1 T.Mk.20 Chipmunk T-176
- de Havilland DH.82C Tiger Moth 8922,
- de Havilland DH.82C Tiger Moth 4947
- de Havilland DH.82C Tiger Moth 4319
- de Havilland Vampire FB.6 J-1145
- de Havilland Canada CSF-2 Tracker 1577
- de Havilland Canada DHC-5 Buffalo 811
- Douglas Dakota III FZ692
- Douglas DC-3 2141
- Fairchild Bolingbroke IVT 10117
- Fairchild Cornell II 10694
- Fairchild Cornell II FV702
- Fairey Firefly VI WH632
- Fleet 21K FAL-11
- Fleet 16B
- Fleet 60K Fort 3540
- Fleet 60K Fort 3643
- Fleet 80 Canuck
- Fleet Finch II 4738
- Fouga CM.170 Magister (Aerospatiale)
- Hawker Hurricane II – Replica
- General Motors TBM-3E Avenger 53858
- McDonnell CF-101B Voodoo 101045
- Nanchang CJ-6A 47-22
- Noorduyn Norseman V N29-47
- North American B-25J Mitchell 45-8883
- North American Harvard IV 20213
- North American Harvard IV 20412
- North American Yale 3350
- North American Yale 3400
- Piper PA-22
- Stinson 10A
- Supermarine Spitfire XVI TE214
- Westland Lysander IIIA 2363

== Images ==
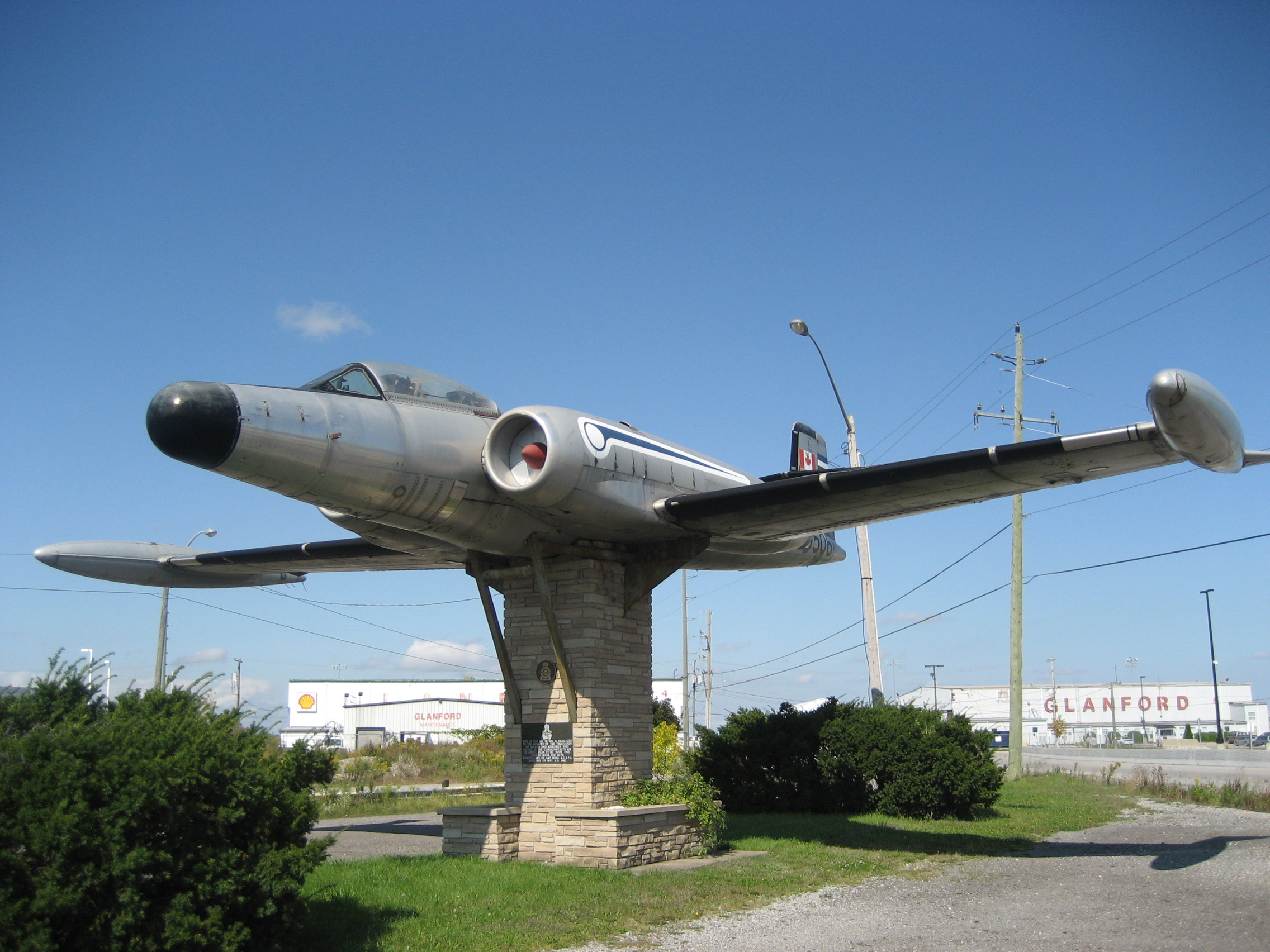
Avro Canada CF-100

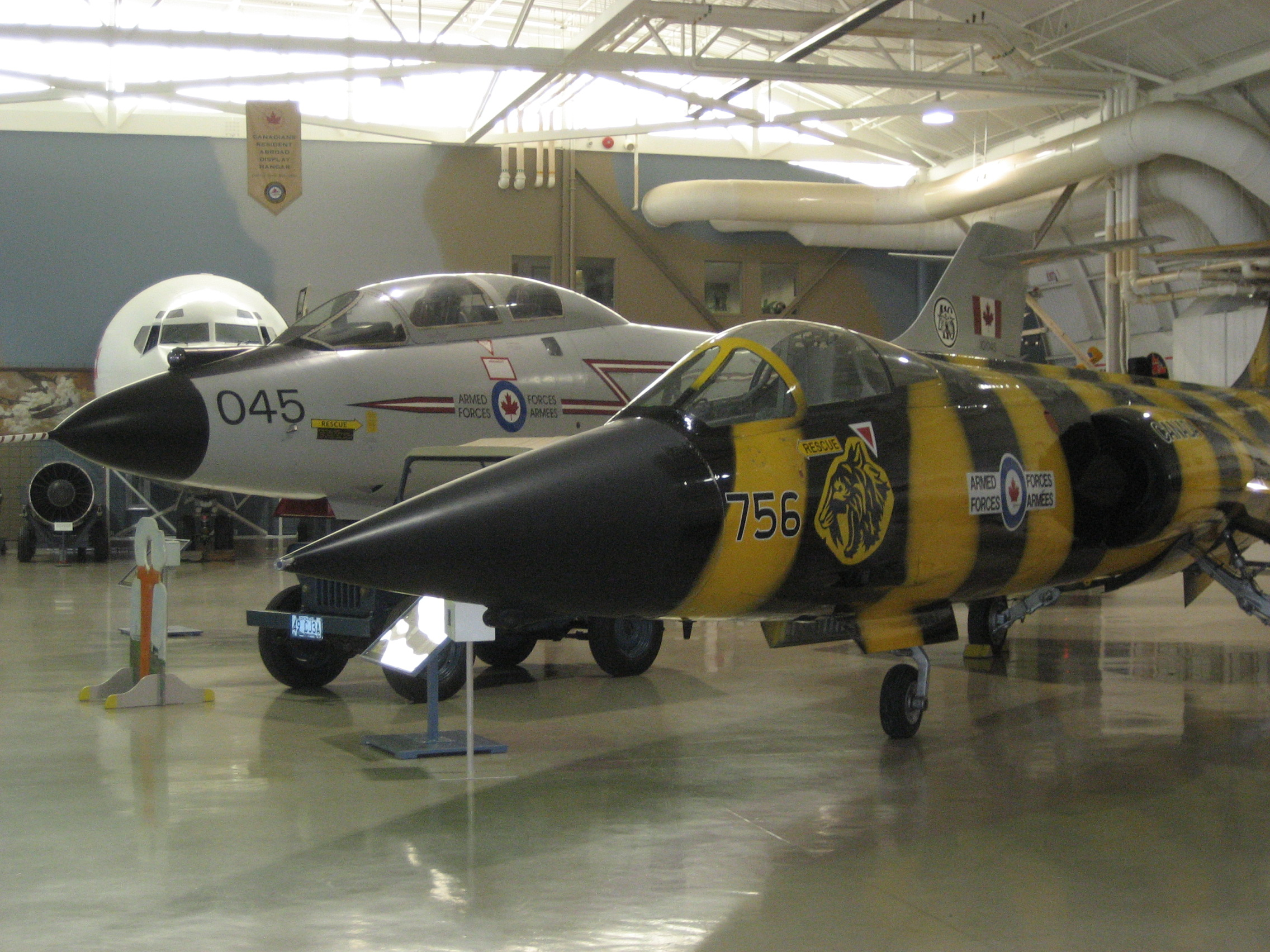
CF-104 Starfighter and CF-101 Voodoo

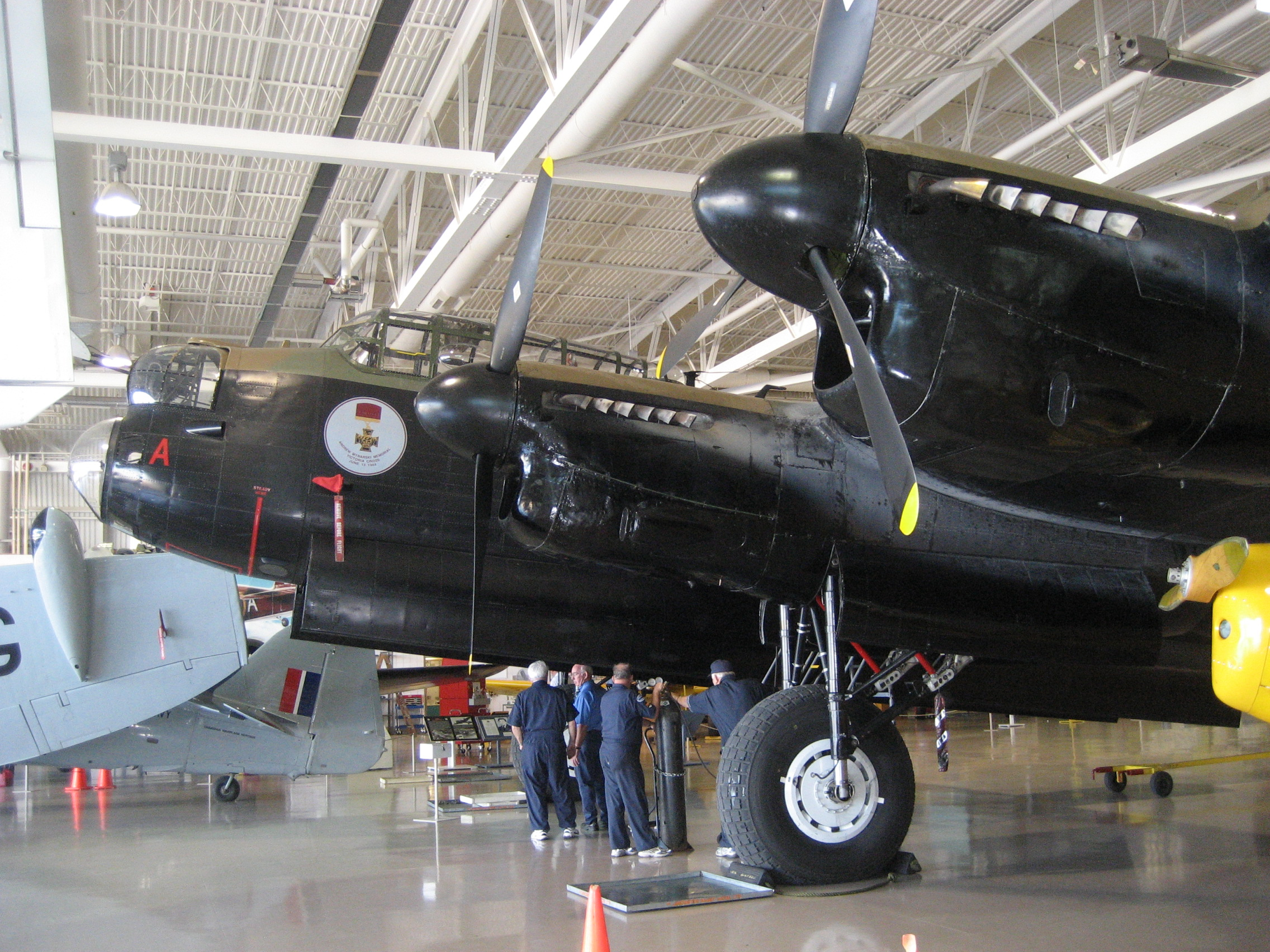
Avro Lancaster

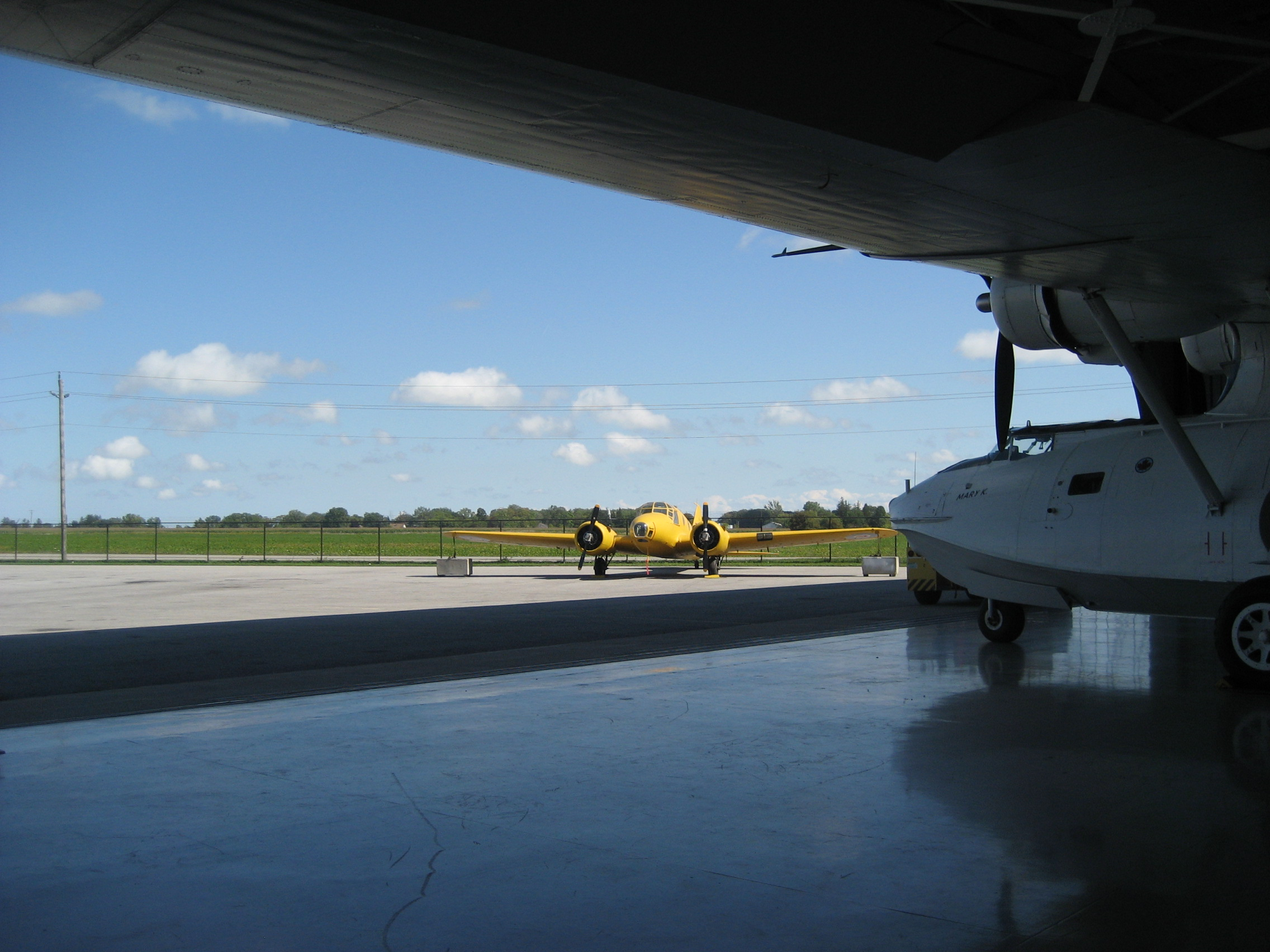
PBY Canso and Avro Anson

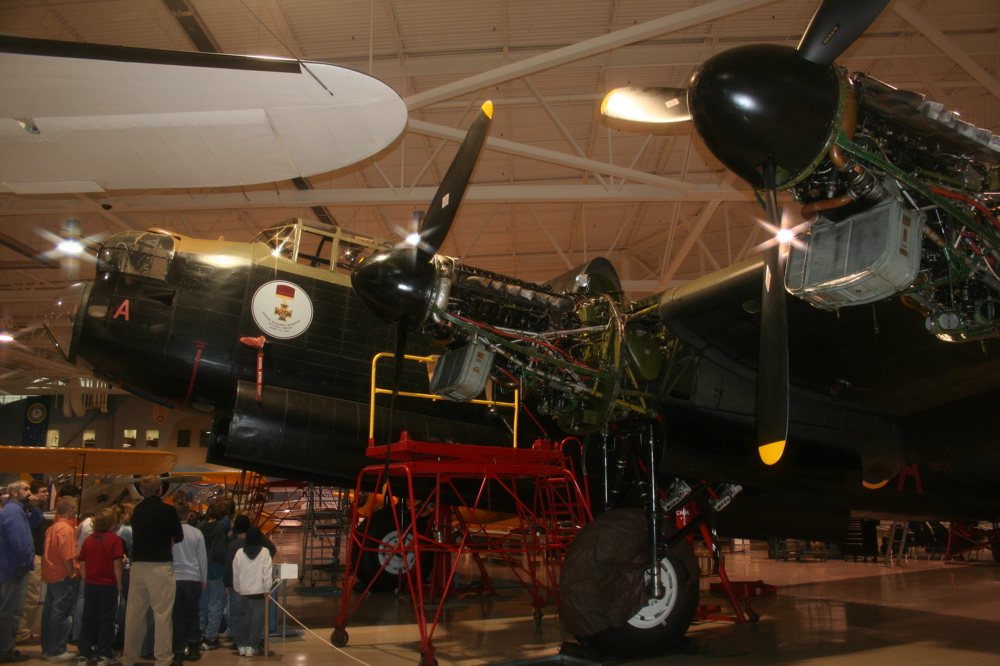
Mynarski Memorial Avro Lancaster

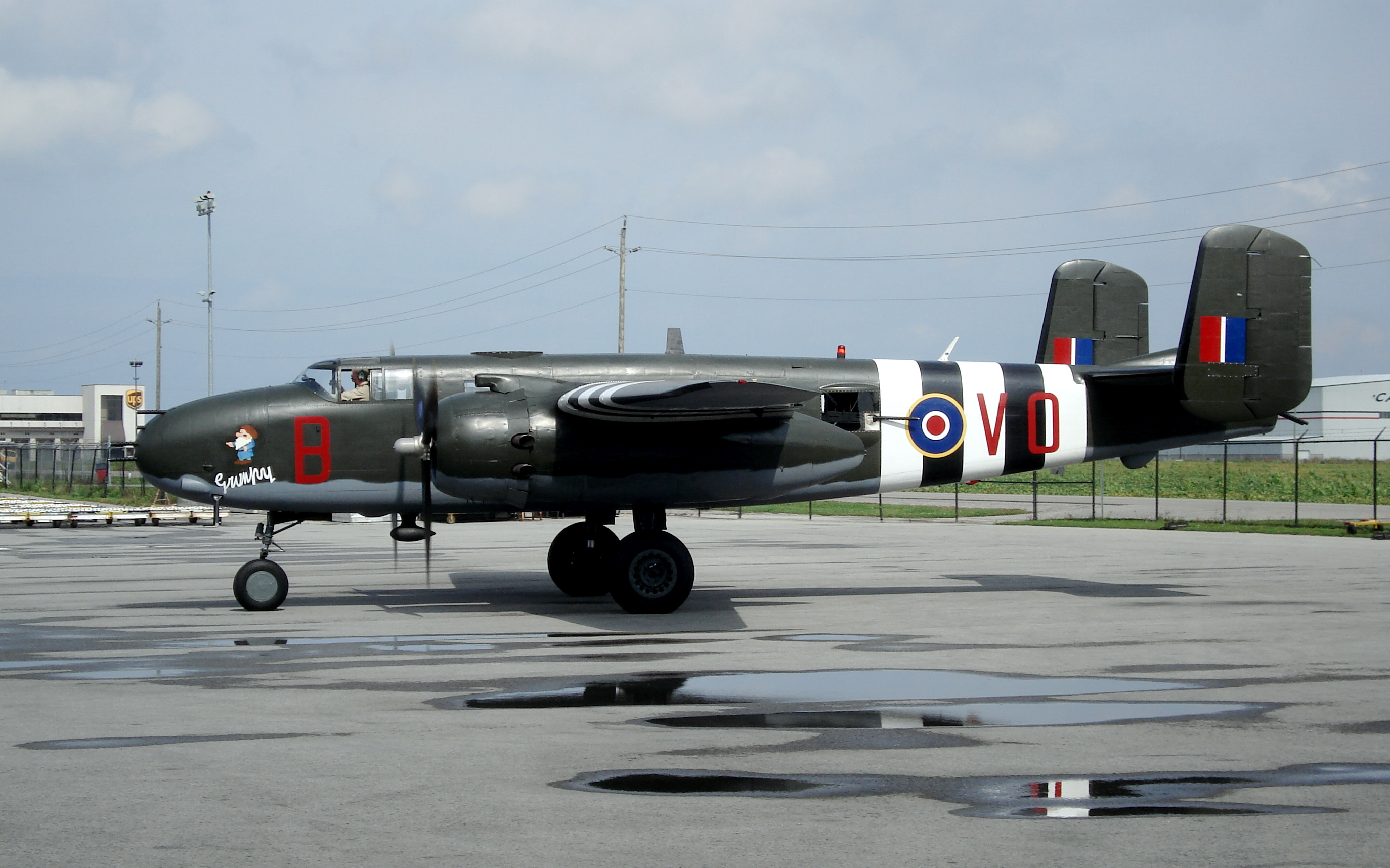
North American B-25J Mitchell

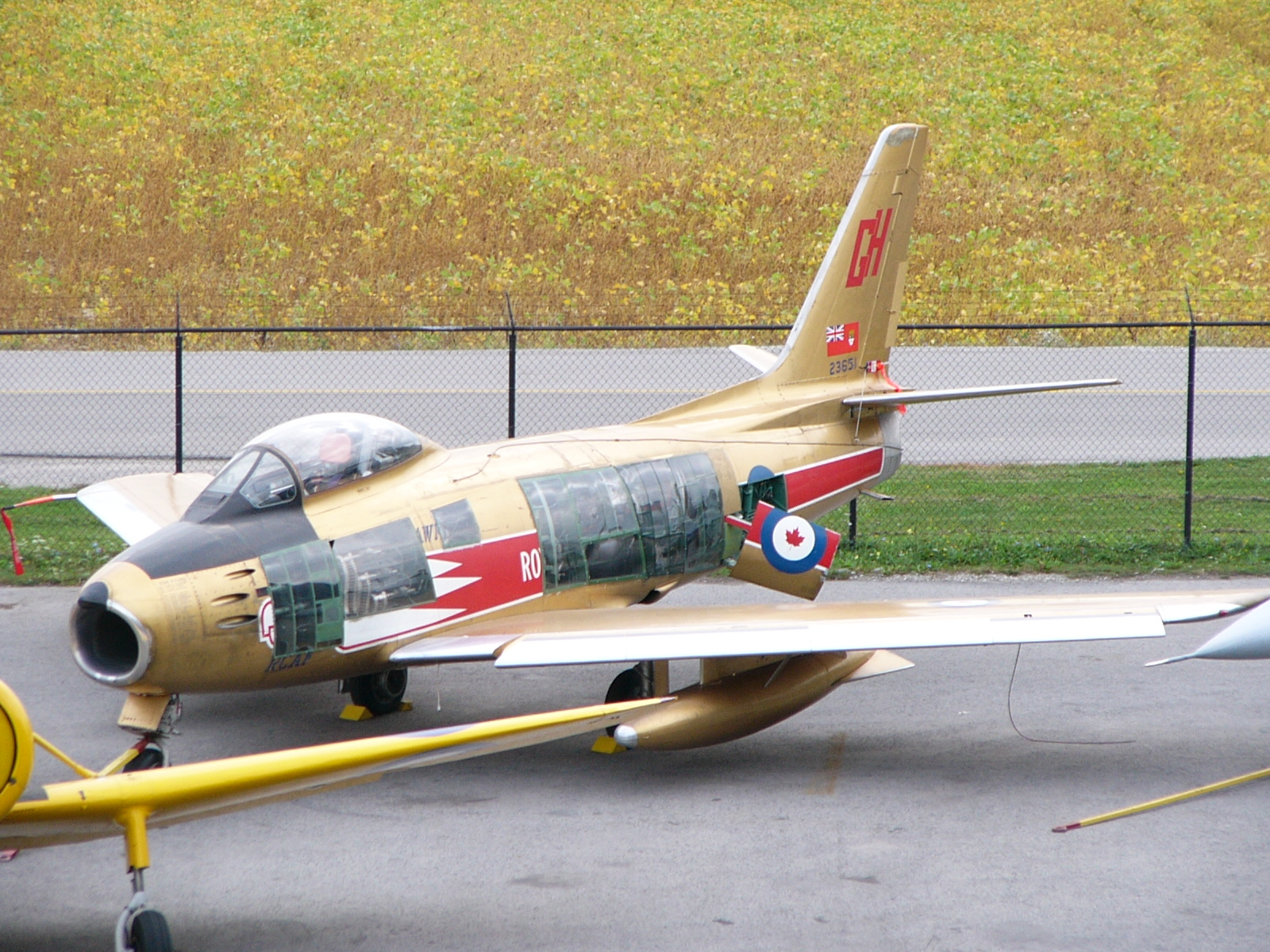
Sabre Mk VI cut-away display

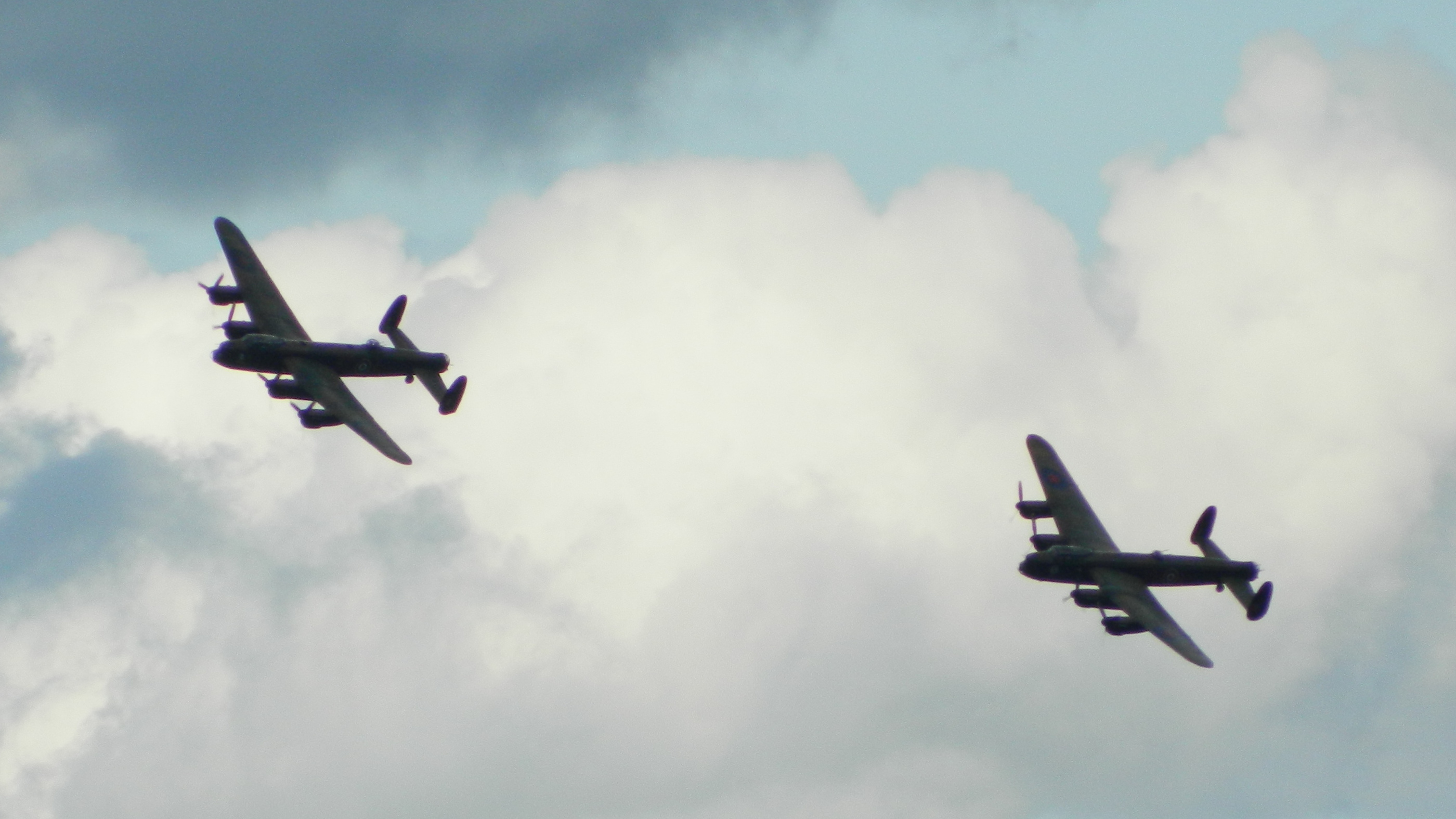
The CWH and BBMF Lancasters during a display in 2014

== Affiliations ==
The museum is affiliated with: CMA, CHIN, OMMC and Virtual Museum of Canada.

== See also ==
- List of aerospace museums
- List of attractions in Hamilton, Ontario
- List of Canadian organizations with royal patronage
- Organization of Military Museums of Canada
- Military history of Canada
