= Avro Lancaster PA474 =

British World War II heavy bomber

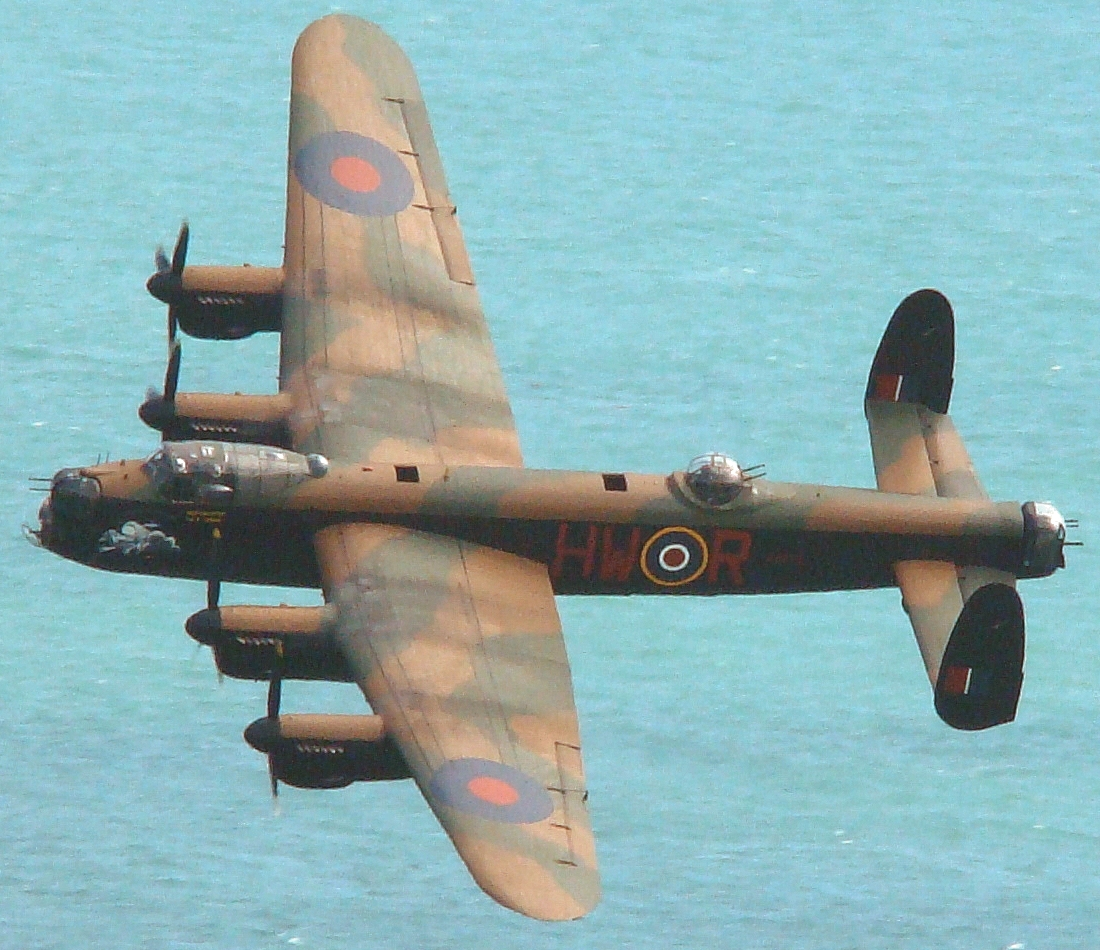

General information
- Other name: City of Lincoln
- Type: Avro Lancaster
- Status: Airworthy
- Owners: Royal Air Force
- Serial: PA474

History
- In service: 1945–present
- Preserved at: Based at RAF Coningsby

Avro Lancaster PA474 is a four-engined, Second World War era, Avro Lancaster heavy bomber operated by the Royal Air Force Battle of Britain Memorial Flight as a tribute to all members of Bomber Command during the Second World War.

PA474 is one of only two Lancasters in flying condition in the world, the other being owned and flown by the Canadian Warplane Heritage Museum.

== History ==
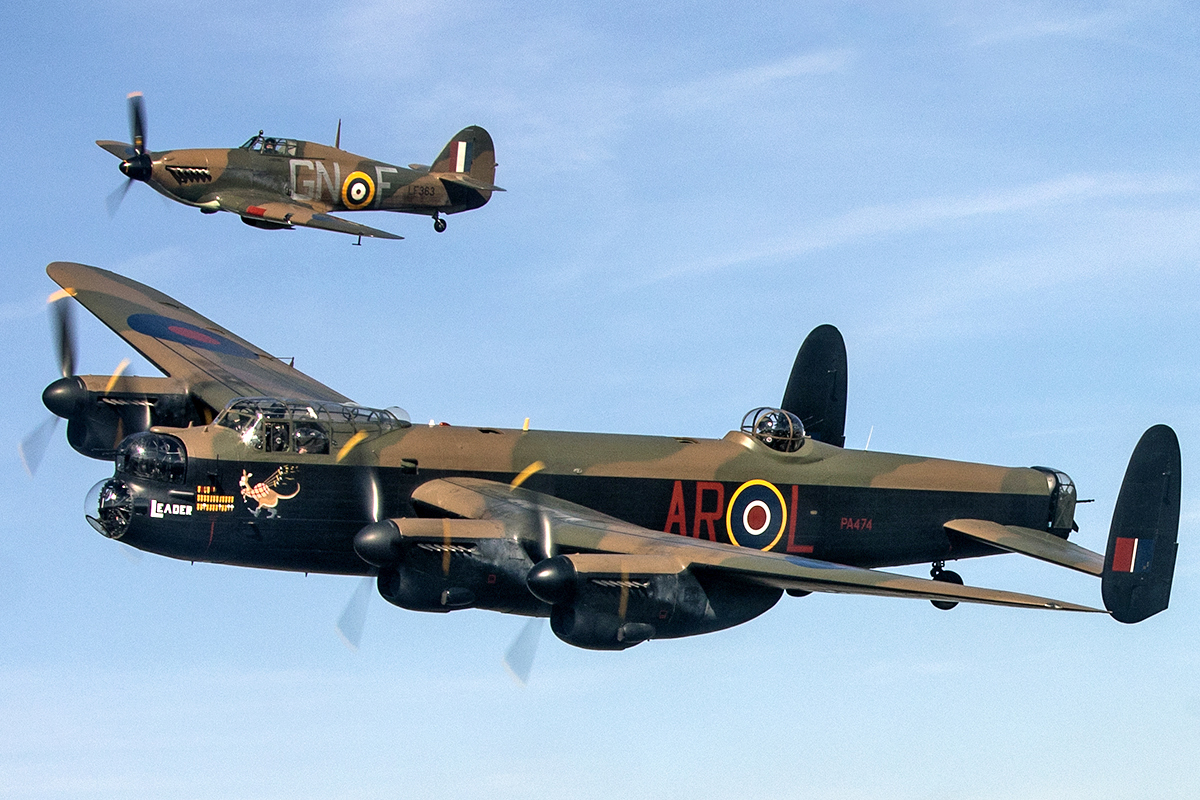
PA474 accompanied by a Hawker Hurricane

PA474 was built as a B Mk 1 (B1) by Vickers-Armstrongs Ltd at its Broughton factory near Chester in 1945 and was to be part of the British Tiger Force for strategic bombing in the Far East. Following the end of the war with Japan the aircraft was not needed and PA474 entered storage. With gun turrets removed it was assigned to Photographic Reconnaissance duties with 82 Squadron in East and South Africa.

On return from squadron service PA474 was loaned to Flight Refuelling Limited to be used as a pilotless drone. Flight Refuelling used an Avro Lincoln instead and PA474 was then transferred to the College of Aeronautics, Cranfield, Bedfordshire to be used for trials on the Handley Page laminar flow wing. The test wings were mounted vertically above the rear fuselage.

In 1964 PA474 came under the control of the Air Historical Branch for possible display in the proposed RAF Museum. During this time the aircraft appeared in two films: Operation Crossbow and The Guns of Navarone. PA474 was stored first at Wroughton and then at Henlow then, after a request in 1965 from 44 Squadron, the Lancaster moved to RAF Waddington for restoration back to wartime standard including refitting the front and rear turrets.

PA474 was transferred to the Battle of Britain Memorial Flight in 1973. In 1975 a mid-upper turret was found in Argentina and fitted. During the winter of 1995 the Lancaster was fitted with a new main spar to extend the flying life.

On 7 May 2015, the aircraft suffered a fire in its starboard outer engine. A safe landing was made at RAF Coningsby. It flew again on 12 October 2015 after extensive work to fix the damage caused by the fire to number four engine. It was later announced that with the ongoing maintenance, PA474 should still be airworthy until 2065.

Minor and Major maintenance and overhauls are completed by Duxford based Aircraft Restoration Company (ARCo), most recently in 2021 where PA474 was with the historic aircraft specialists for 10 months.

== See also ==
- List of surviving Avro Lancasters
