= Avro Lancaster FM213 =

Avro Lancaster

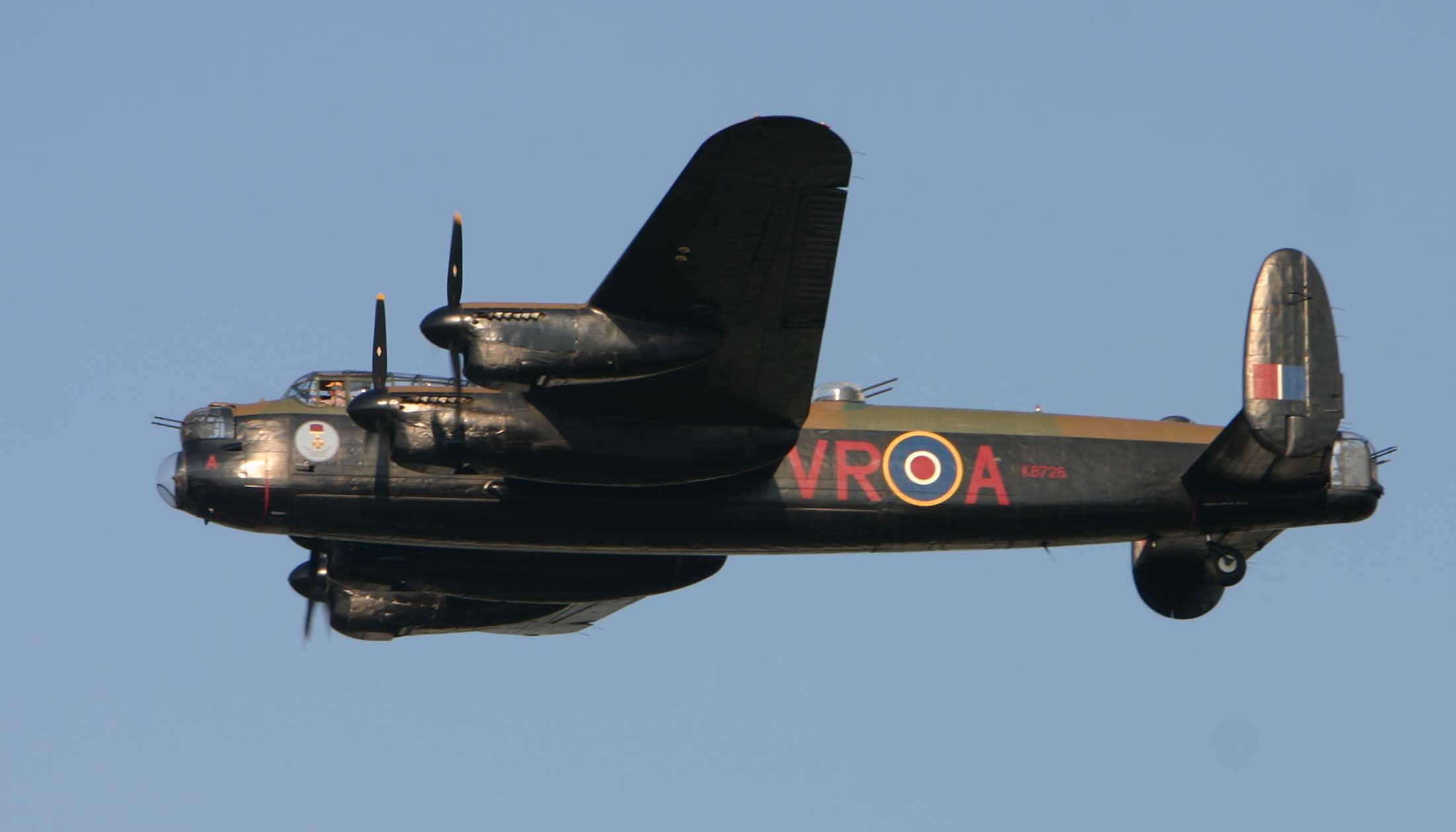
FM213 performs a fly-past during the 2006 EAA AirVenture airshow.

FM213 is an Avro Lancaster, one of only two airworthy examples in the world. It was built in Malton, Ontario, at Victory Aircraft as construction number 3414 and rolled out in July 1945. Built as a Mark X bomber, it was no longer needed in Europe and transferred directly to storage at CFB Trenton. It was later modified for maritime reconnaissance but damaged during delivery and underwent repairs in 1953. FM213 spent the next ten years as a search and rescue aircraft over the Atlantic Ocean.

She retired in November 1963 and was sold to the Royal Canadian Legion as a gate guard in Goderich, Ontario. In 1977 she was donated to the Canadian Warplane Heritage Museum and was airlifted to Hamilton in 1979 by a Chinook helicopter. She underwent lengthy restoration before taking flight once again in September 1988, and has been flying about 50 hours a year since.

Officially registered with the civilian tail code C-GVRA, the restored FM213 was first painted as RCAF KB726, VR-A, in commemoration of the aircraft which was involved in an action in which Andrew Mynarski won the Victoria Cross in 1944. Referred to officially as the "Mynarski Memorial Lancaster", but unofficially as "VeRA", she is a frequent sight at airshows and free-flights over the Greater Toronto and Hamilton Area. In 2014 she crossed the Atlantic to take part in a series of flights with the only other airworthy Lancaster, PA474. It has also been painted as VR-R KB772 "Ropey" and as VR-X, "X-Terminator".

== History ==
=== Lancaster Mark X ===
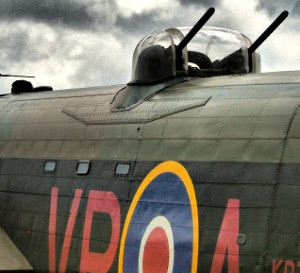
The only obvious external difference between the Mark I and all but the initial production of the Mark X, was the Martin 250CE (versus Frazer-Nash) turret, with the Martin using larger caliber guns, as seen here on FM213.

Victory Aircraft was set up as one of many Canadian shadow factories during the early stages of World War II to provide a supply of military equipment that was safe from German bombing. The company built its factory at the recently constructed Malton Airport, which at that time was far in the countryside outside Toronto, although well served by road and rail links.

In September 1941, Victory received a contract to build the Avro Lancaster under license. Using a variety of Canadian and American systems, the aircraft would be known as the Mark X, although it would be similar to the Avro-built Mark I models. In addition to using the US-built Packard V-1650 Merlin engines in place of their Rolls-Royce counterparts, Victory later modified the design by replacing the original Frazer-Nash mid-upper turret with the widely used Martin 250CE which featured the much more powerful Browning .50 caliber machine gun in place of the FN's 0.303-inch Browning machine guns. The aircraft were otherwise similar to the point that damage in any aircraft could be fixed using parts from its counterparts.

The first Mark X first flew in August 1943 and by 1945 were being delivered to operational squadrons in the UK at the rate of one per day. A total of 430 Mark X's were produced, but most of these were in 1945 and a number were still in Canada when the war in Europe ended. Left with these surplus aircraft, the Royal Canadian Air Force (RCAF) sent them into storage in various locations. Construction number 3414 was one of these; after basic flight tests she was taken on strength by the RCAF as FM213 on 21 August 1945, and then flown directly to CFB Trenton and immediately put into storage.

=== 10MR conversion ===
In 1950, with the Cold War opening, the RCAF was lacking any long-range maritime reconnaissance aircraft and developed a plan to convert the surplus Lancasters to the role while developing plans for a more capable aircraft. Victory, which had been sold to Hawker Siddeley and reorganised as Avro Canada, won the contract to modify the aircraft to what was known as the "10MR" version. Avro's plants were gearing up for production of the Avro Canada CF-100 Canuck, so they subcontracted much of the work to de Havilland Canada at Downsview Airport.

By this time most of the surviving Lancasters had been sold off for about $400 each by Crown Assets Distribution. A number remained at Trenton, and FM213 was part of a set of ten that were dismantled and shipped to Downsview on 28 August 1950. The conversion effort was considerable and FM213 was not complete until January 1952. After flight tests at Downsview she was re-registered as VC-AGJ and assigned to 405 Long Range Patrol Squadron at RCAF Station Greenwood in Nova Scotia. On 24 January 1952 on the first leg of her ferry flight, via Trenton, she had a serious landing accident after stalling just short of the runway and suffering a ground loop as a result.

Many more airframes were needed than the small numbers still in storage, which had prompted Mickey and Bud Found, of Found Aircraft, to begin scouring Alberta for them after recalling many had been sold there. They eventually found 50 complete aircraft which they sold back to the government for $10,000 each. When Bud heard of the accident with FM213, he contacted the RCAF and noted that he had seen several additional airframes in Alberta that were not suitable for returning to flight but might be useful for repairing FM213. This ultimately led to Clifford Doan's farm near RCAF Station Penhold where KB895 "Lady Orchid" was in terrible condition. The centre section was salvaged and sent to Downsview. FM213 was repaired in July 1953 and flew again on 26 August.

=== Search and rescue ===
By this time the RCAF was receiving a number of Lockheed Neptunes for the MR role and sending their Lancasters to other roles. FM213 was then flown to RCAF Station Torbay, today's St. John's International Airport, to join 107 Rescue Unit RCAF. She was assigned tail code VC-AGS, which later changed to CX-213. FM213 spent the next decade as part of 107, flying patrols over the Atlantic Ocean. As part of these duties, she crossed the Atlantic on several occasions, including three times to escort the British royal family on flights to North America, as well as similar duties as part of Operation Jump Moat in June 1958, which delivered CF-100 Canucks to the Belgian Air Force.

=== On display ===
FM213 was officially retired on 6 November 1963 and sent to storage at RCAF Station Dunnville near Hamilton, Ontario. She was purchased by Royal Canadian Legion Branch 109 in Goderich, Ontario, and flew to Goderich Airport on 14 June 1964, before being officially struck from the RCAF charge on 30 June. After lengthy preparation, she was mounted on three pylons and officially dedicated on 15 September 1964.

By 1977, FM213 was in poor shape, the victim of the weather and vandalism. The Legion did not have the funds for a restoration and began plans to sell the aircraft. The Canadian Warplane Heritage Museum expressed an interest, but could not reach an agreement. Eventually, local businessman Bruce Sully solved the problem by arranging for the Legion to donate the aircraft in exchange for Sully starting a scholarship fund for the Legion members' children. The deal closed on 1 July 1977.

=== Flying again ===
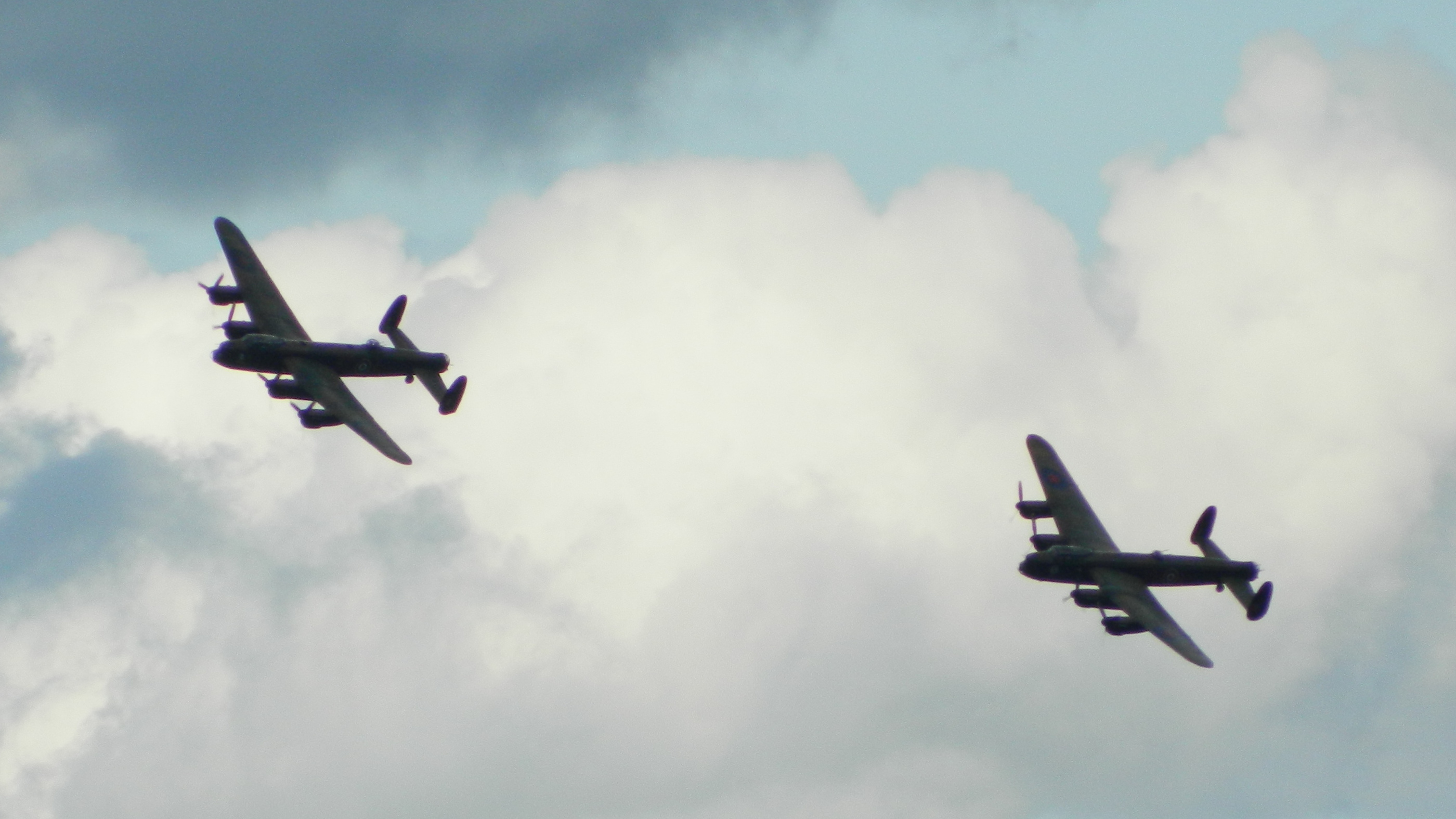
In 2014, FM213 crossed the Atlantic to tour with the Battle of Britain Memorial Flight, which operates the only other airworthy Lancaster, PA474 seen here with VeRA.

After two years of preparation and partial disassembly, FM213 was airlifted to the museum's base at the Hamilton International Airport by a Canadian Armed Forces Boeing CH-47 Chinook. Returning the aircraft to flight status entirely by volunteers took almost ten years. She flew again on 11 September 1988, and since then has flown for roughly 50 hours a year.

The aircraft was initially painted as the wartime KB726/VR-A of No. 419 (Moose) Squadron. On the night of 12–13 June 1944, "A for Apple" was hit by fire from a German night fighter and engulfed in flames. While preparing to jump from the aircraft, mid-upper gunner Andrew Mynarski noticed tail gunner Pat Brophy was trapped. Mynarski later died of burns he received while attempting to free Brophy, actions that led to Mynarski winning the Victoria Cross. Brophy survived when the aircraft broke apart on impact, catapulting him from the turret.

The aircraft has carried several different paint schemes since then. In 2014 it briefly wore KB772/VR-R "R for Ropey"'s distinctive shark-mouth pattern, but returned to VR-A for a flight across the Atlantic to tour the UK with the only other flying Lancaster, PA474. In 2015 she was repainted again, this time with KB732/VR-X, "X-TERMINATOR", which flew 84 missions during the war.
