= GCSurplus =

Canadian government department

- Formerly: War Assets Corporation; Crown Assets Disposal Corporation; Crown Assets Distribution Service Line
- Founded: 1944; 82 years ago
- Headquarters: Gatineau, Quebec, Canada
- Number of locations: 16 Regional Offices
- Area served: Canada
- Owner: Government of Canada
- Parent: Public Services and Procurement Canada
- Website: www.gcsurplus.ca/mn-eng.cfm

GCSurplus is a Canadian government department responsible for handling moveable Crown assets that a federal department or agency has declared as surplus under the Surplus Crown Assets Act (R.S., c. S-20, s. 1). Surplus assets are typically auctioned off to the public through the GCSurplus website.

Public Services and Procurement Canada (PSPC) operates nine GCSurplus sales centres, formerly known as Crown Asset Distribution Centres (CADCs). These centres are located across the country and manage the disposal of moveable federal government surplus material. Acting as the Government of Canada's agent, PSPC provides client departments with a disposal service through direct sales or through the management of contracts with service providers.

== History ==
In 1944, the Government of Canada created the War Assets Corporation, which was subsequently renamed the Crown Assets Disposal Corporation after the Second World War. In 1984, the activities and staff of the corporation were integrated into the Department of Supply and Services. The organization became known as the Crown Assets Distribution Service Line and has continued its functions within PSPC.

The organization became known as GCSurplus in 2009, coinciding the launch of an online bidding system.

== Mandate and activities ==
Its mandate is to manage the surplus moveable assets disposal program for the government, providing quality service to clients while obtaining the best value for the Crown. The legislative base for its operations is the Surplus Crown Assets Act along with the Treasury Board Policy on the Disposal of Surplus Moveable Crown Assets. With a few exceptions, the legislation and policy require PSPC to manage the disposal of surplus assets on behalf of federal organizations. The Act was amended in 1993 to provide departments with additional options for the disposal of surplus moveable assets, subject to terms and conditions to be prescribed by the Treasury Board of Canada.

Since its founding, GCSurplus have been involved in the direct sale of surplus materials ranging from ships and cars to furniture and clothing, as well as seized goods on behalf of federal government departments and agencies. Surplus assets are sold directly by GCSurplus or through contracted service providers. Many assets are sold through public sales that attract thousands of buyers, and, in some cases, sales are conducted at GCSurplus sales centres.

Many transactions also take place through the GCSurplus website, where each item is listed and described, often accompanied by a photo. The RFP/RFI process to let the contract was released to public view in June 2013, while Rona Ambrose was Minister of PSPC. The site received over 50,000 visitors per month.

GCSurplus also act as agents for foreign governments in the sale of their surplus assets located in Canada and have working arrangements with certain European governments for disposal of Canadian military surplus located in their countries.

== Sale process ==
Departments or federal bodies notify GCSurplus of their surplus assets by filling out a Report of Surplus form and sending it to the nearest sales centre. GCSurplus then handles all aspects of asset disposal from start to finish.

The process can include: organizing sales of assets; arranging for viewing of assets; conducting sales; evaluating bids; receiving money; handling all sales-related inquiries; and returning net proceeds to clients.

Once the item is sold, the client receives the net proceeds from the sale and a transaction report.

== Donations ==
Sometimes, government ministers can authorize "Gratuitous transfers" (donation) of valuable assets. This category consists of assets which have marketable value, but which are being donated to recipients which a custodian minister designates in order to meet specific or general program purposes of government. Some donations are pre-approved as part of an ongoing government program (e.g. the Computers for Schools Program). In all other cases, the donation must be approved by the minister through whom the department reports to Parliament. Gratuitous transfers should normally be carried out by an officer of the custodian department. Contractors should not normally be used.

== See also ==
- Government auction
