= Canadian Aviation Museum =

Aviation museum in Windsor, Ontario, Canada

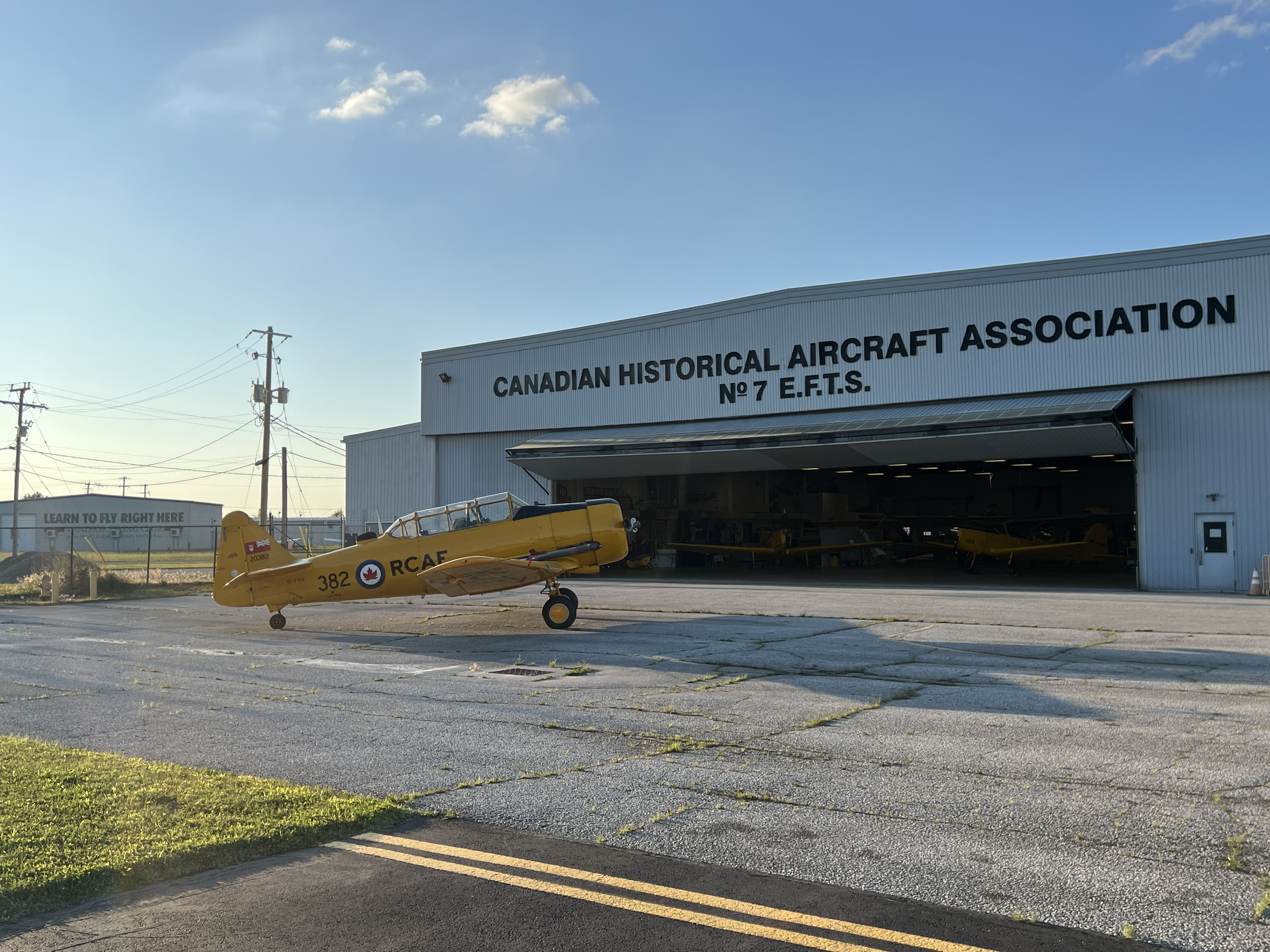
- North American Harvard C-FVIJ in front of the Canadian Aviation Museum hangar.

- Location within Ontario
- Former name: Canadian Historical Aircraft Association (CH2A)
- Location: Windsor International Airport in Windsor, Ontario
- Coordinates: 42°16′6.797″N 82°58′2.501″W
- Type: Aviation museum
- President: John Robinson
- Website: canadianaviationmuseum.ca

The Canadian Aviation Museum (CAM), is a non-profit organization and aviation museum located at the Windsor International Airport in Windsor, Ontario, Canada. The museum has 12 jets and propeller-driven aircraft on display. They are committed to preserving aircraft which have significance to the history of Canadian aviation.

Displayed is a collection of Canadian aircraft, many in flying condition. The museum is also restoring several Second World War aircraft, including a De Havilland Mosquito and Avro Lancaster. The airworthy aircraft conduct honour flights, special event fly-bys and appear at aviation events around southern Ontario.

== History ==
Founded in 1994 as the Canadian Historical Aircraft Association (CH2A), the Canadian Aviation Museum is a charitable, non-profit organization whose mandate is to acquire, document and preserve a collection of antique or vintage military and civilian aircraft important to Canadian aviation history.

They are located in the former hangar of the No.7 Elementary Flying Training School which was built at one of the 231 locations used for the British Commonwealth Air Training Plan during World War II. This facility was used to provide basic flight training to 2267 Commonwealth pilots from around the world. The hangar was used by Air Canada in the 1950's and 1960's, then was acquired by the Windsor Flying Club. Upon the completion of the Flying Club's own facility next door, the hangar was acquired by Canadian Aviation Museum in 1993.

The Canadian Aviation Museum is in charge of the maintenance and restoration of Avro Lancaster FM212. The aircraft was purchased by the City of Windsor and a group of former Royal Air Force and Royal Canadian Air Force veterans in 1964 and placed on display in Jackson Park. In 2005, the aircraft was removed from the park after 40 years due to significant damage from weather and vandalism and was transported to the Canadian Aviation Museum's restoration facilities. FM212 is one of 17 Avro Lancasters left in the world.

Museum staff are also building a de Havilland Mosquito bomber based on KB161, the first Canadian-built Mosquito bomber to enter World War II. Parts were recovered from a crash site at Pelly Lake and are being incorporated into the project.

The museum is run by a team of volunteers and is supported by memberships, sponsorships, donations and fundraising.

== Collection ==
As of September 2025, Transport Canada lists the following aircraft in the museum's collection as airworthy.

- Boeing Stearman PT-17 Kaydet (C-FAPG)
- de Havilland DHC-1B-2-S3 Chipmunk 151-189 (C-FCYR)
- de Havilland DHC-1B-2-S5 Chipmunk 192-230 (C-FBMN)
- de Havilland DH.82C Tiger Moth 636 (CF-CIH)
- Fairchild 24R Argus RCAF 4809 (C-FGZL)
- North American Harvard CCF4-173 (C-FVIJ)

As of September 2025, the museum lists the following aircraft in its collection as on display or in restoration.

- Avro Lancaster FM212
- Canadair CT-133 133299
- de Havilland DH98 Mosquito
- Evans VP-1 Volksplane
- Fairchild PT-26 Cornell III 10730
- Fleet Fawn 68
- Hawker Siddeley HS-748 1723
- North American NA-64 Yale 64-2158

== See also ==
- List of aerospace museums
- Military history of Canada
