= Battle of Britain Memorial Flight =

- Battle of Britain Memorial Flight badge
- Active: 11 July 1957 – Present
- Country: United Kingdom
- Branch: Royal Air Force
- Type: Flying unit
- Role: Historic aircraft display flight
- Size: Twelve aircraft
- Part of: No. 1 Group (Air Combat)
- Home station: RAF Coningsby
- Nickname: BBMF
- Patron: The Prince of Wales
- Motto: Lest We Forget
- Website: Official website

Commanders
- Officer Commanding: Squadron Leader Paul Wise

Aircraft flown
- Bomber: Avro Lancaster B Mk. I
- Fighter: Hawker Hurricane Mk. IIc; Supermarine Spitfire Mk. IIa; Supermarine Spitfire Mk. Vb; Supermarine Spitfire LF Mk. IXe; Supermarine Spitfire LF Mk. XVIe; Supermarine Spitfire PR Mk. XIX
- Trainer: de Havilland Canada Chipmunk T.10
- Transport: Douglas Dakota C Mk. III

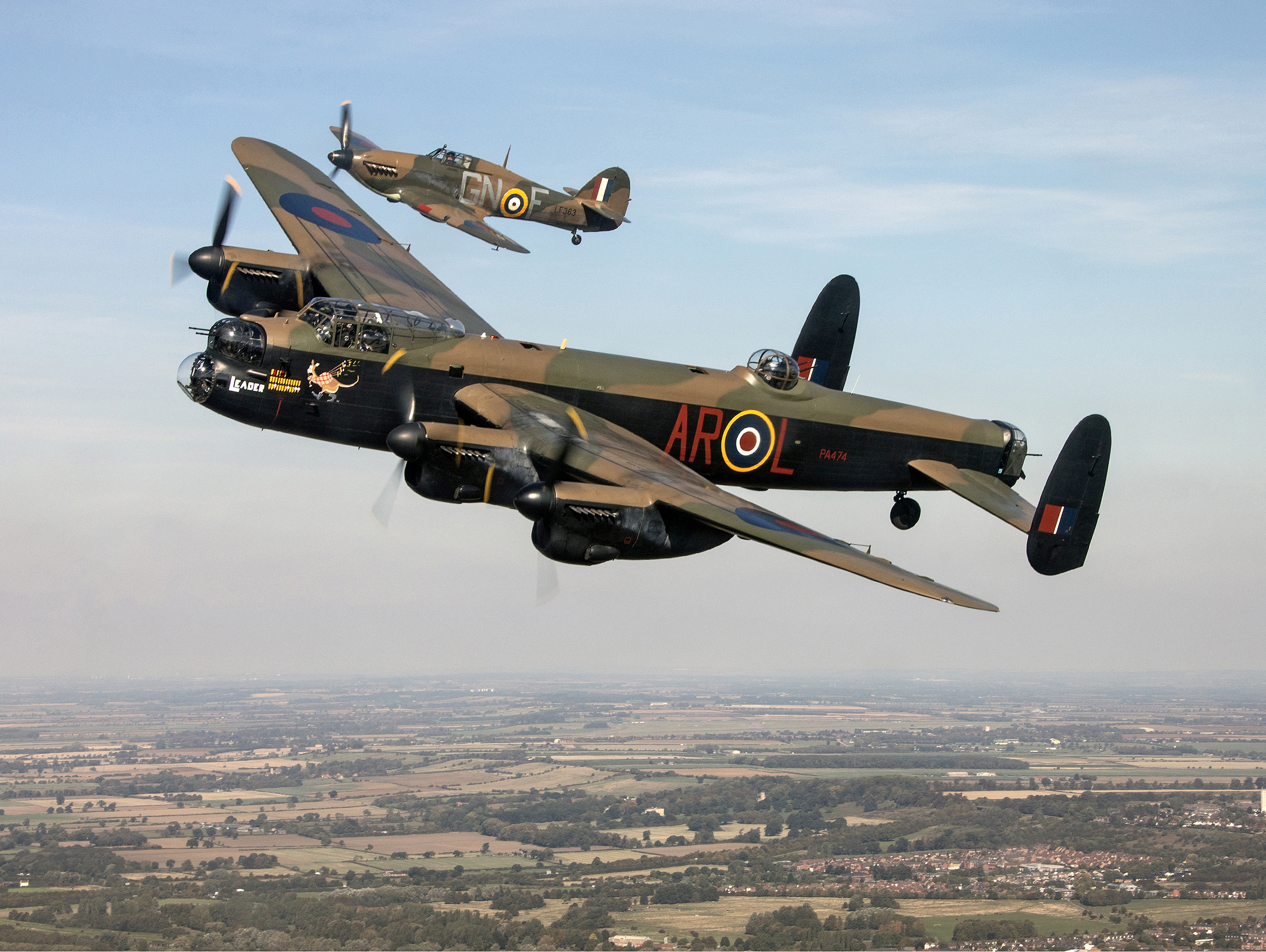
Lancaster B I PA474 in 460 Squadron (RAAF) colours, escorted by Hurricane Mk.IIc LF363 in 249 Sqn livery.

The Battle of Britain Memorial Flight (BBMF) is a Royal Air Force flight which provides an aerial display group usually comprising an Avro Lancaster heavy bomber and two fighters, a Supermarine Spitfire and a Hawker Hurricane. The aircraft are regularly seen at events commemorating the Second World War and upon British State occasions, notably Trooping the Colour, celebrating Queen Elizabeth II's 80th birthday in 2006, and the wedding of Prince William and Catherine Middleton in 2011, and at air displays throughout the United Kingdom and Europe.

The flight is administratively part of No. 1 Group (Air Combat) RAF, operating out of RAF Coningsby in Lincolnshire, England.

== Aircraft history ==
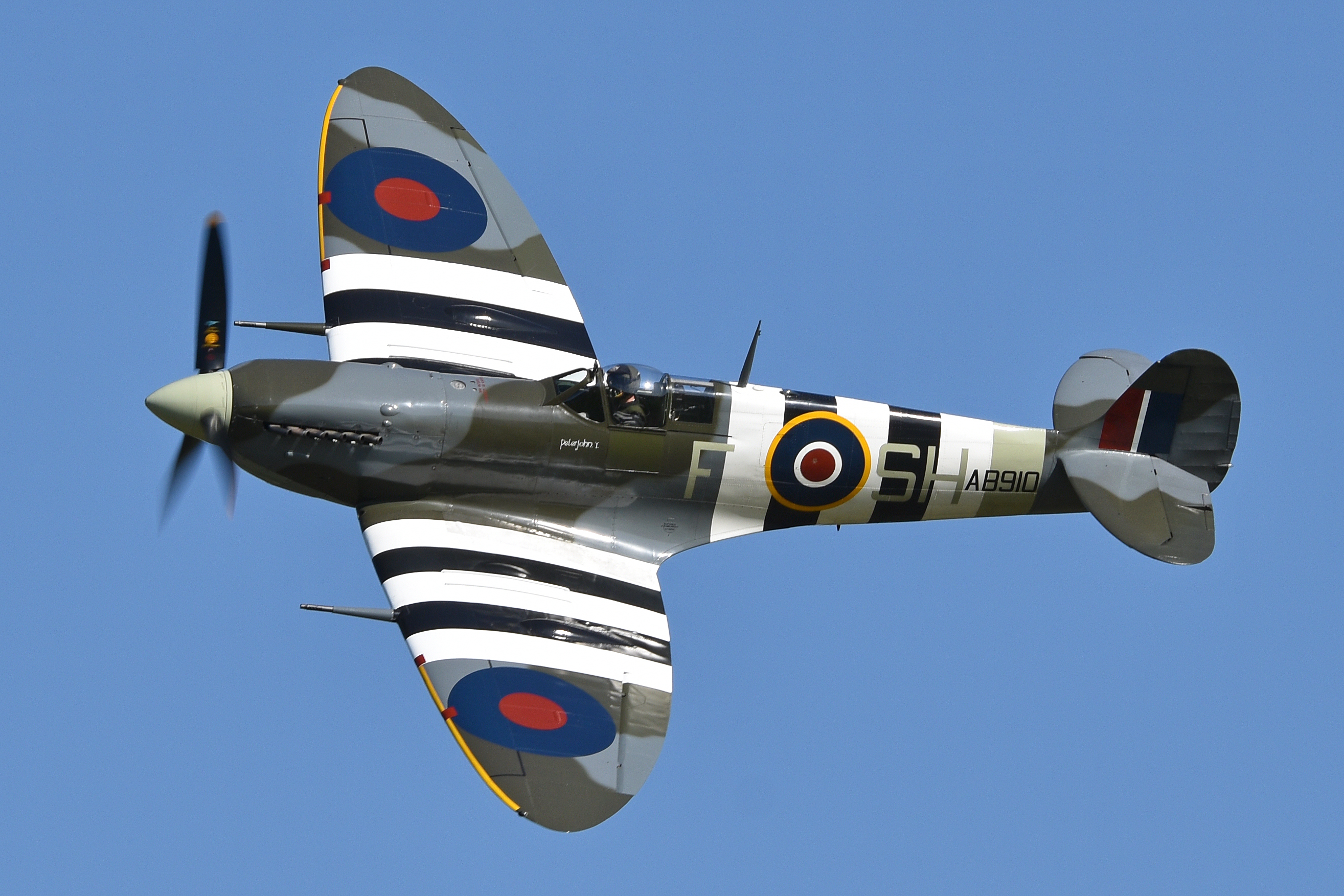
Spitfire AB910, built in 1941, painted in the colours of Spitfire BM327 No. 64 Squadron; this aircraft was flown by Flight Lieutenant Tony Cooper during Operation Overlord on 6 June 1944, hence the D-Day stripes.

Although usually seen flying in a formation of three, the Lancaster flanked by a fighter on each wing, the BBMF comprises a total of 12 aircraft:

- 1 Avro Lancaster
- 6 Supermarine Spitfires
- 2 Hawker Hurricanes
- 1 Douglas Dakota
- 2 de Havilland Canada DHC-1 Chipmunks

Aircraft currently in the flight have served with the RAF, the United States Army Air Forces, and the Royal Canadian Air Force, as well as having been privately owned; whilst in the RAF, they were flown by Czechoslovak, Polish, South African, American and Canadian pilots. Some were sold for scrapping and later saved, whilst at least one has been on operational service with the RAF for almost fifty years.

=== Spitfires ===
Individual aircraft have historic heritages; the oldest of the Spitfires, P7350 (G-AWIJ), is a Mk.IIa, which originally flew in the Battle of Britain in 1940, with No. 266 (Rhodesia) Squadron RAF and 603 (City of Edinburgh) Squadron AAF. It was also used by No. 64 Squadron RAF and No. 616 Squadron RAF. In 2019 she was repainted in the No. 54 Squadron code 'KL-B', which represents the aircraft flown by Al Deere from 10 July 1940 until 31 August 1940.

The Mk Vb Spitfire, AB910, built in 1941 escorted convoys in the Battle of the Atlantic. She then flew escort patrols during bombing raids on the German battleships Scharnhorst and Gneisenau, then (as part of No. 133 (Eagle) Squadron), she fought in the Dieppe Raid. Capping this long career, as part of No. 402 Squadron RCAF, she flew cover patrols over the Normandy beaches on D-Day and in the subsequent weeks – as did another of the flight's Spitfires, with No. 443 Squadron RCAF. As of August 2018, AB910 was adorned with the D-Day colour scheme of Flight Lieutenant Tony Cooper's 64 Squadron Mk Vb 'SH-F' (BM327) "PeterJohn1" (named after his new-born son).

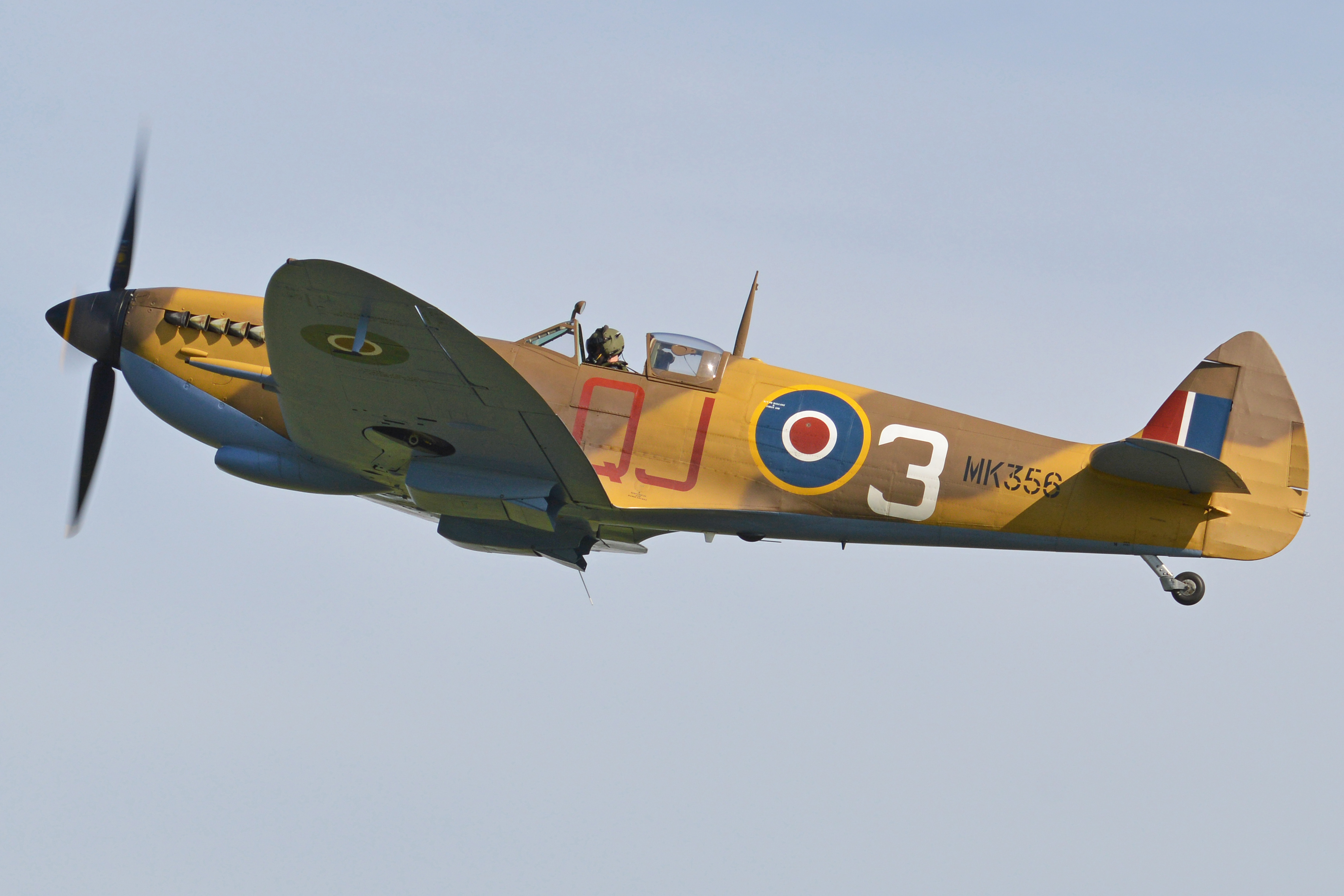
Battle of Britain Memorial Flight Spitfire LF Mk. IXe, MK356, QJ-3, 2017

The Mk LFIXe Spitfire, MK356, was built in March 1944 and fitted with a Merlin 66 engine with a two-speed, two-stage supercharger optimised for low altitudes. Allocated to the Royal Canadian Air Force (RCAF) No. 144 Wing, based in various locations around southern England, she took part in the Rodeo fighter sweep over occupied France in the weeks leading up to D-Day. After the war she served as a gate guardian at Hawkinge and Locking, and was recovered and refurbished in 1992 for the BBMF. From 2017 she was displayed in a desert paint scheme used by No. 92 (East India) Squadron in Tunisia in 1943. The aircraft crashed in 2024, killing the pilot.

There are also two PRXIX Spitfires, both built in 1945 with Griffon 66 engines. PM631 was too late to see operational services in the Second World War and carried out civilian duties with the Temperature and Humidity Monitoring Flight (THUM) at RAF Woodvale until 11 July 1957, when she became part of the Historic Aircraft Flight; she is the longest-serving aircraft in the BBMF and is currently painted in her original PR Blue markings last worn in 1957.

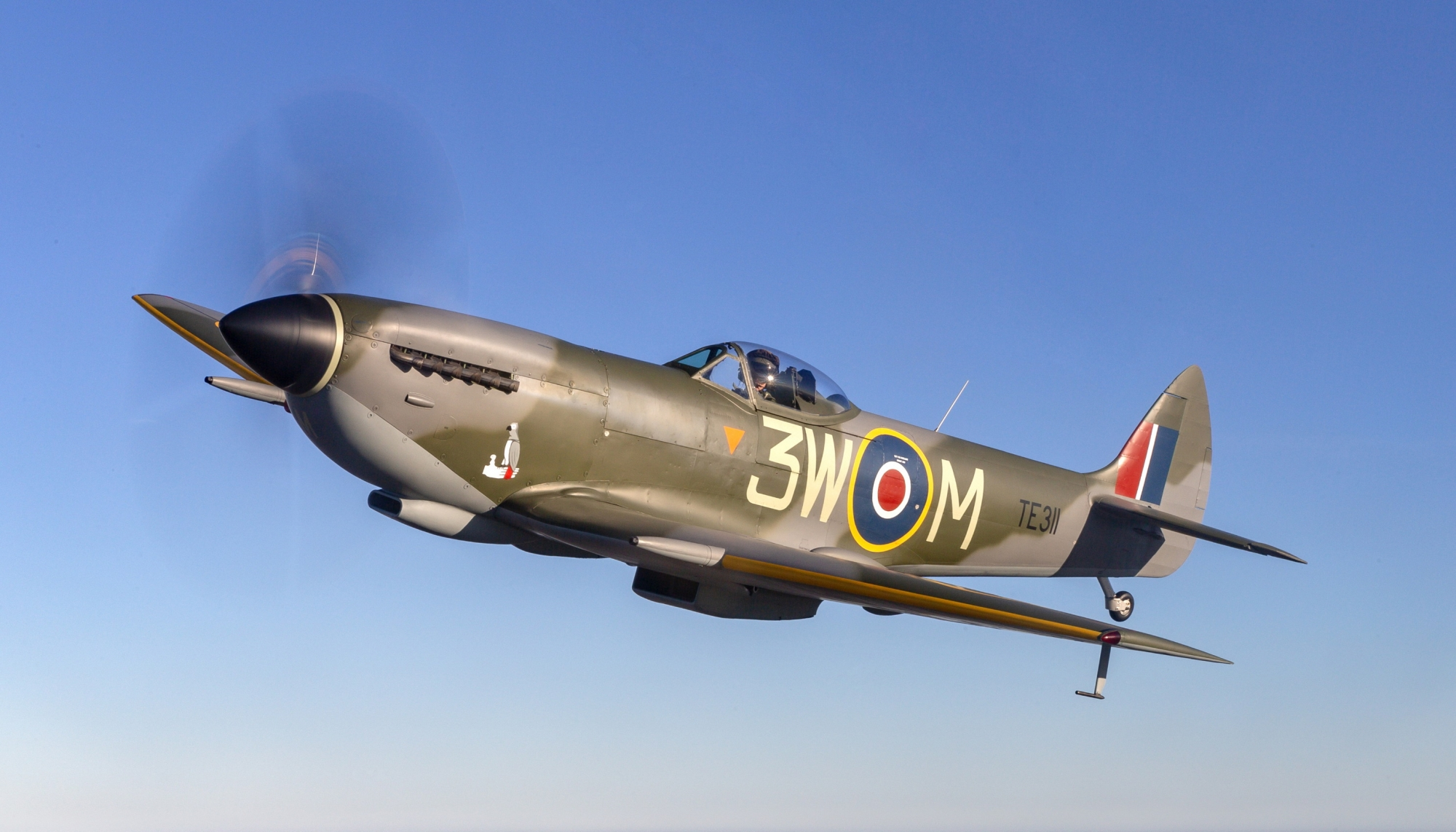
Spitfire TE311 in the colour scheme of No. 322 (Dutch) Squadron.

PS915 was operated by No. 541 Squadron RAF and performed various reconnaissance duties at RAF Wunstorf in Germany. She returned to the UK in 1954 and was retired to gate guarding duties. In 1987 she was modified with a Griffon 58 engine and refurbished to flying condition by British Aerospace. She currently carries the markings of PS888 of 81 Squadron based at Seletar, Singapore, during the Malayan Emergency which conducted the last operational RAF Spitfire sortie on 1 April 1954, photographing communist guerrilla hideouts over an area of jungle in Johore. The ground crew painted the inscription "The Last!" on PS915's left engine cowling.

One Mark XIX Spitfire, PS853, was sold in 1996 to defray the costs of rebuilding Hurricane LF363 after her crash-landing on the runway at RAF Wittering due to engine failure in 1991.

Spitfire Mark XVI TE311, built as a low-back with clipped wings and powered with a Packard Merlin engine, was acquired in 2002 and initially allocated for spares, but officially added to the BBMF collection in 2007. TE311 was made airworthy in the later stages of the 2012 display season. Since January 2024, TE311 has worn the livery of No. 322 (Dutch) Squadron and its Squadron code "3W-M", along with the Squadron's mascot, "Polly Grey", a red-tailed African Grey parrot, on its nose. In July 2024 the aircraft's starboard (right) side was repainted to display the fictitious squadron code "L-NG" in memory of Squadron Leader Mark Long, along with his name and rank pennant under the cockpit.

=== Hurricanes ===
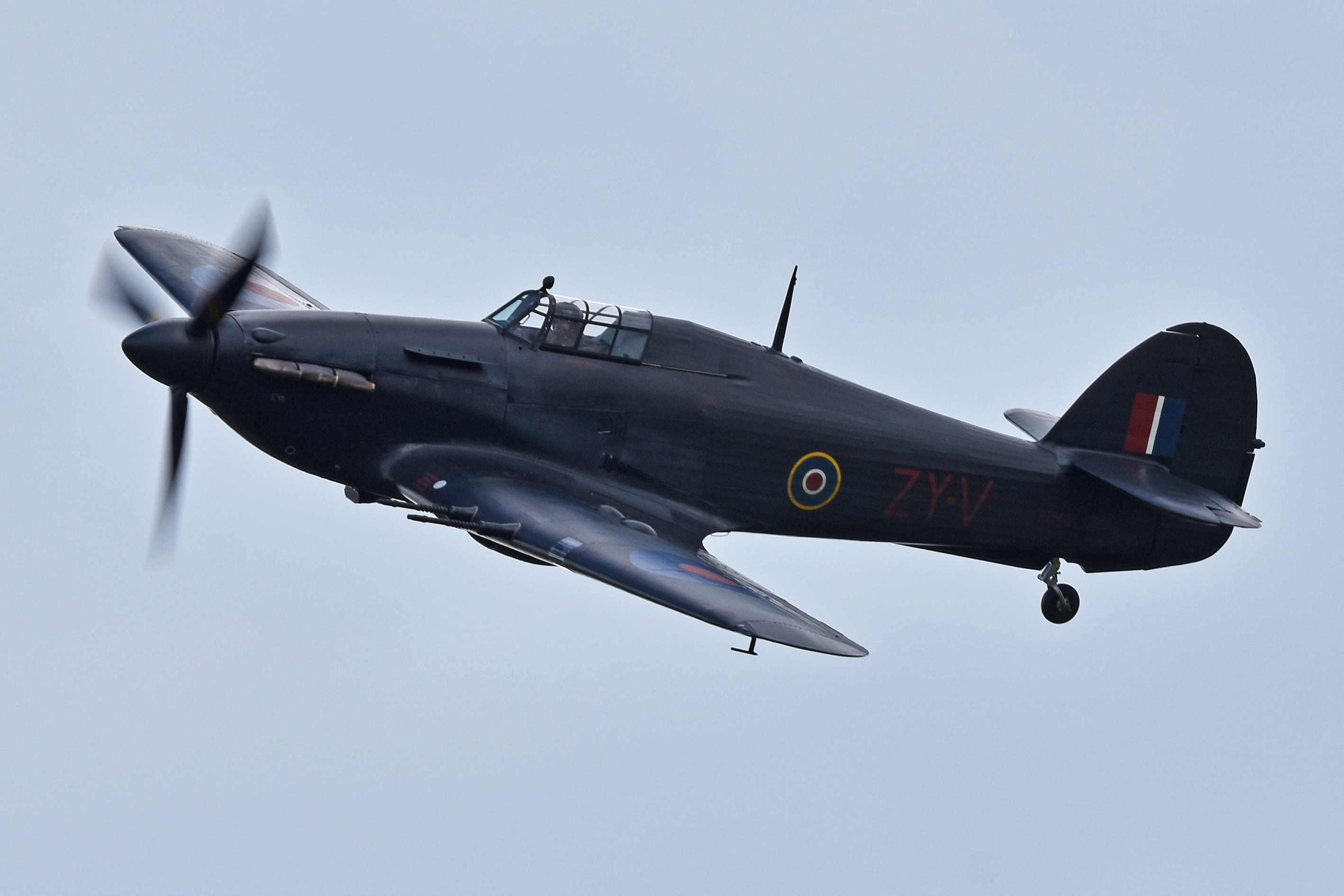
Hurricane PZ865 sporting an all black Night Fighter scheme of No. 247 Squadron.

There are two Hurricanes. LF363 is a Mk IIc and was first flown on 1 January 1944 and the last Hurricane to have entered service with the RAF. She appeared in the films Angels One Five, Reach for the Sky, The Battle of Britain, and a TV series The War in the Air. PZ865, is a Mk IIc, rolling off the production line on 27 July 1944. It was built six months after LF363; originally owned by Hawker Aircraft, it was handed over to the BBMF during 1972. She is the last Hurricane ever to have been built. She once wore the inscription "The Last of the Many" on her port and starboard sides – the original fabric with this inscription is now located in the BBMF Headquarters at RAF Coningsby.

=== Lancaster ===
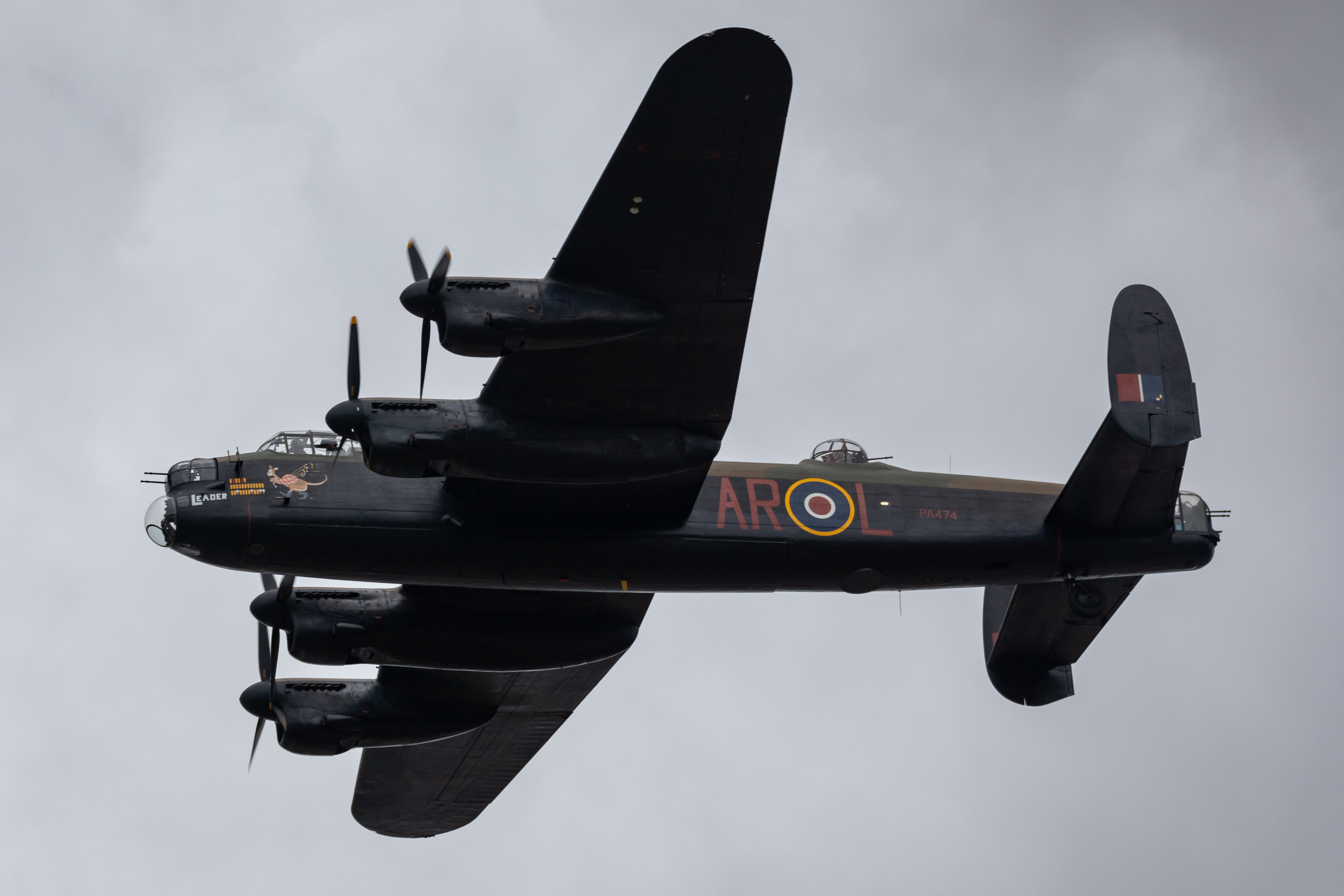
Lancaster PA474 'AR-L' at RIAT 2023.

The Lancaster bomber – PA474, acquired by the BBMF in 1973, is one of only two surviving airworthy examples of the type; the other is in Canada. She was completed on 31 May 1945 and assigned to reconnaissance duties at No. 82 Squadron RAF after appearing too late to take part in the bombing of Japan. After various duties, she was adopted by the Air Historical Branch for display work. She appeared in two films: Operation Crossbow and The Guns of Navarone. Having been flown for much of her service with the BBMF as the "City of Lincoln", PA474 previously wore the markings of the "Phantom of the Ruhr", a Lancaster that flew 121 sorties (a so-called "ton-up" Lancaster). Originally assigned to 100 Squadron in June 1943, the original "Phantom" was transferred to 101 Squadron in November that year and finished the war as part of 550 Squadron at RAF Ludford Magna. The Lancaster currently carries the markings of AR-L 'Leader', which served with No. 460 Squadron RAAF.

PA474 displays the markings of bombs for operations over Germany, ice-cream cones for operations over Italy and poppies when she releases poppies during exhibition flights. During the 2008 RAF Waddington Air Day, PA474 was flown in formation with the recently restored Avro Vulcan XH558 in an historic display of two Avro "heavy metal" classics.

=== Dakota ===
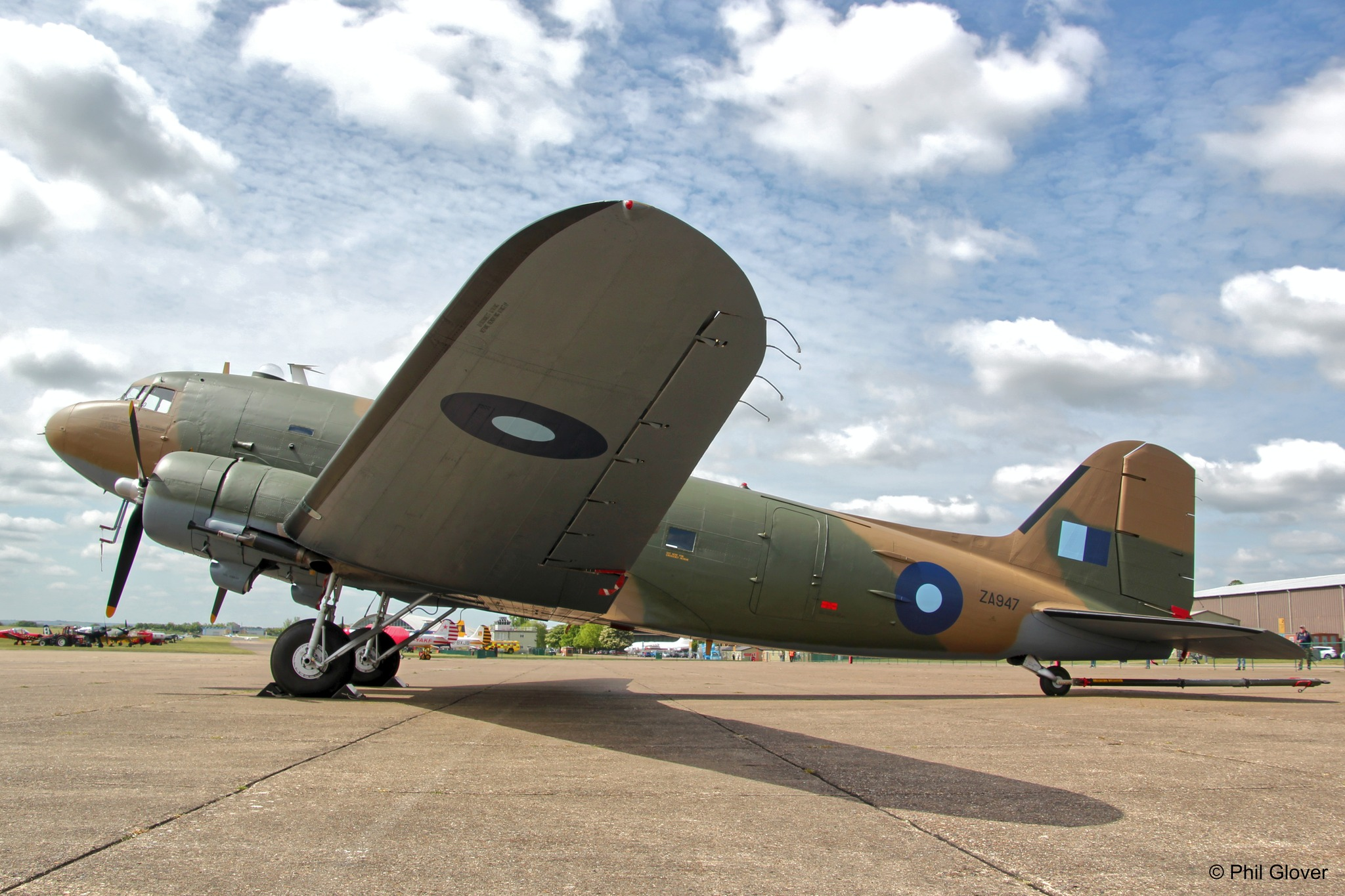
Dakota ZA947 as of 2025 wears the colour scheme of No. 31 Squadron South East Asia Command (SEAC).

The Douglas Dakota, ZA947, built at Long Beach, California in March 1942, was issued to the United States Army Air Forces and later transferred to the Royal Canadian Air Force where she served until 1971. The aircraft was purchased by the Royal Aircraft Establishment before being issued to the BBMF in March 1993. She is equipped with authentic period 'para seats' and is used in commemorative parachute drops.

The Dakota did serve solely as a support aircraft for the flight and as a multi-engine tail-wheel trainer for the Lancaster, but is now also used as a display aircraft.

=== Chipmunks ===
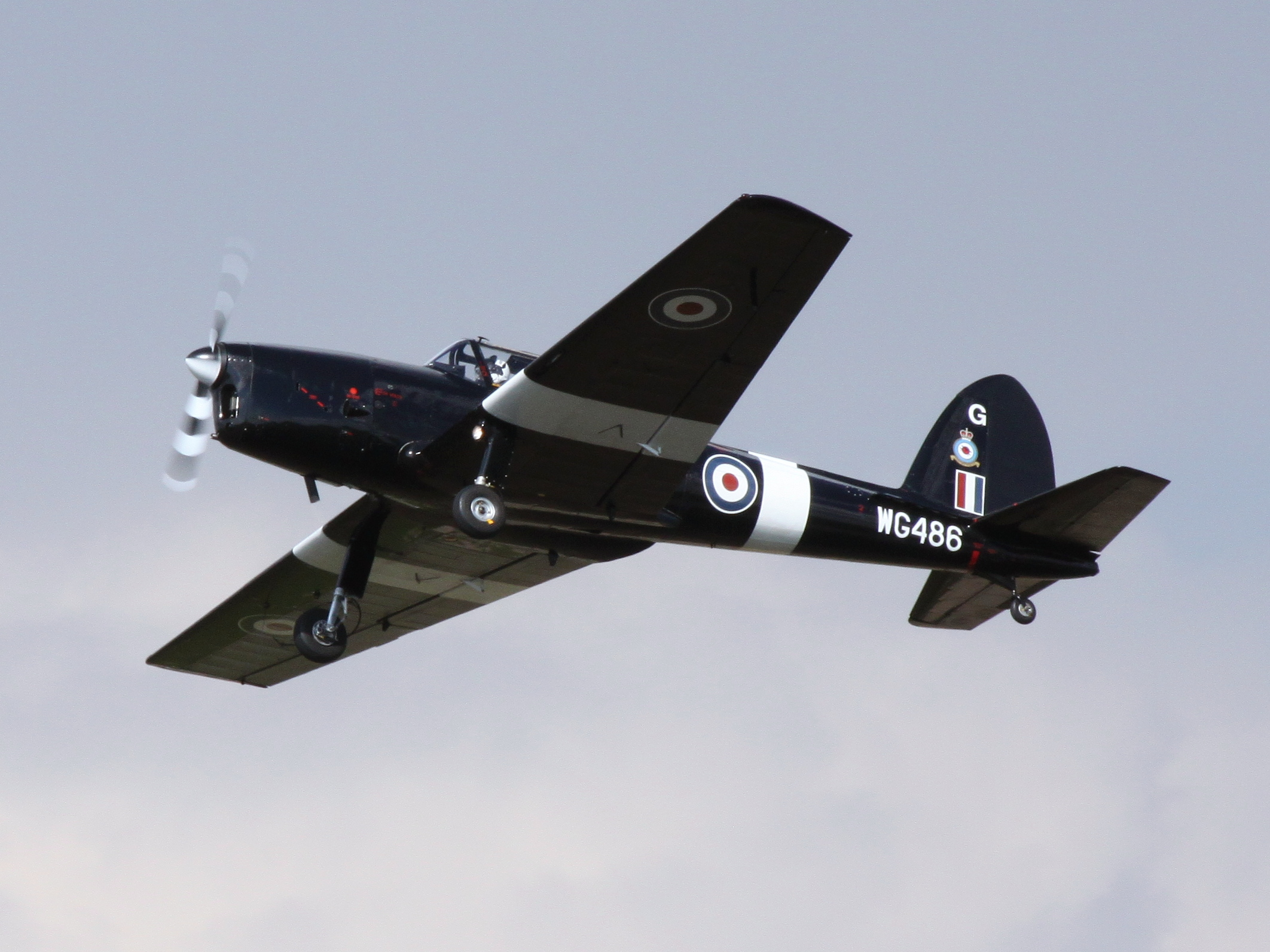
DHC-1 Chipmunk T10 WG486 in 2010

The two de Havilland Canada DHC-1 Chipmunks (WG486 and WK518), are the last in RAF service, but are not intended for display use; rather, they serve to give pilots experience in flying aircraft with a tailwheel landing gear, a design that has now vanished from the modern RAF fleet. Chipmunk WG486 flew reconnaissance missions over East Germany, as part of the RAF Gatow Station Flight, in co-operation with the British Commander-in-Chief's Mission to the Group of Soviet Forces in Germany, commonly known as BRIXMIS.

=== Flypasts ===
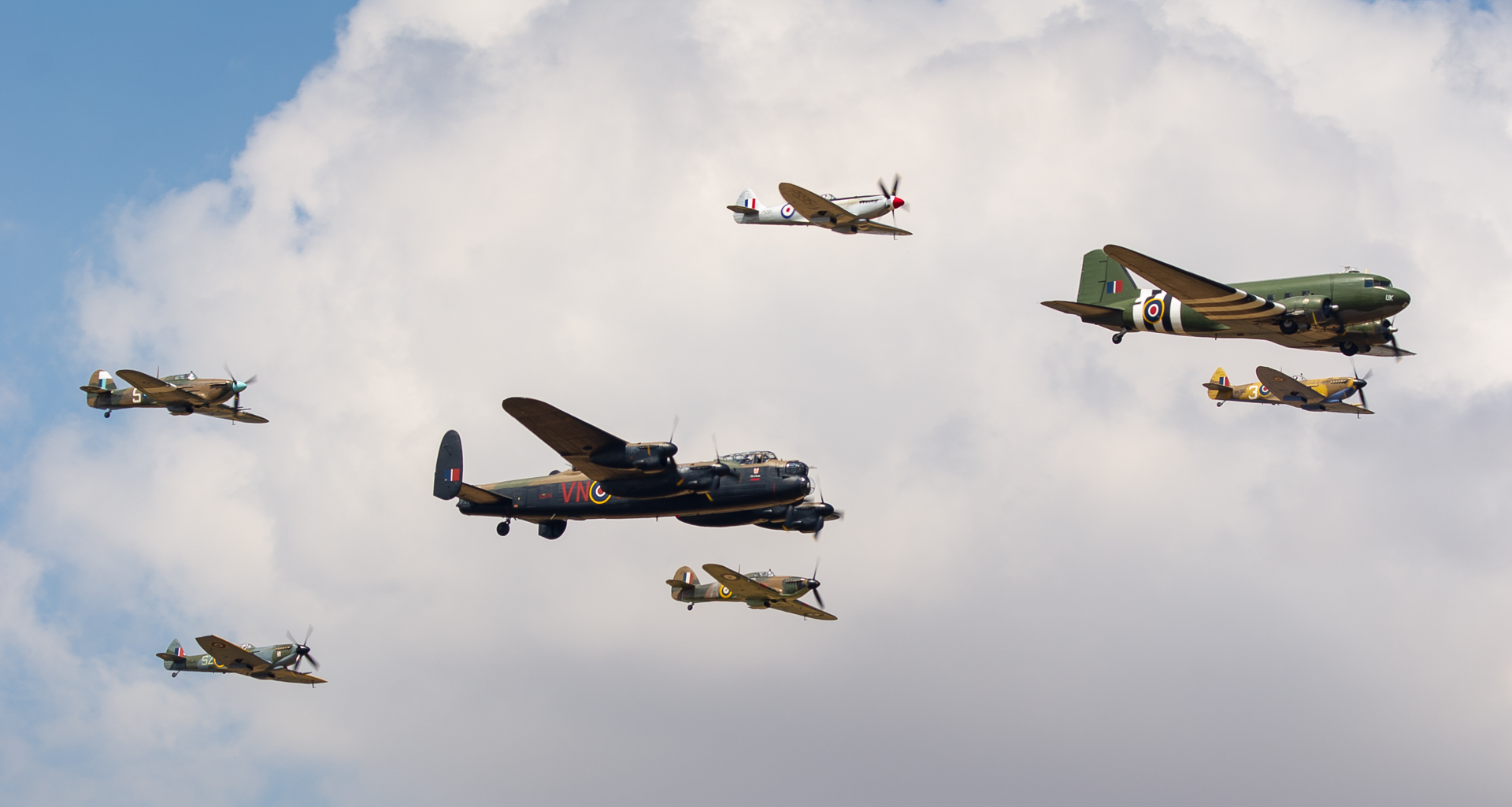
Two Hawker Hurricanes, three Supermarine Spitfires, one Douglas Dakota and one Avro Lancaster in Trenchard Plus formation at RIAT 2018.

The flight also regularly takes part in combined flypasts with other recognisable British aircraft, such as the Red Arrows. It appeared on occasion with Concorde before that aircraft's withdrawal from service in October 2003.

For much of the 2014 display season the flight was joined by Canadian-built Lancaster Mark X FM213. This aircraft is owned and operated by the Canadian Warplane Heritage Museum and made the 3,000-mile trip to the UK, via Goose Bay in Canada and Keflavík in Iceland, arriving at RAF Coningsby on 9 August. FM213 (C-GVRA) is dedicated to the memory of P/O Andrew Mynarski Victoria Cross and is referred to as the "Mynarski Memorial Lancaster". It is painted in the colours of his aircraft KB726 – VR-A, which flew with RCAF No. 419 (Moose) Squadron, and is affectionately known as Vera. She displayed with PA474 in the first Lancaster two-aircraft formation for 50 years, with both Lancasters visiting a large number of air shows and events before Vera's departure back to Canada in mid-September.

== Aircraft ==
Current aircraft
Model	Mark	Registration	Built	Joined BBMF	Status	Notes	Refs
Avro Lancaster	B Mk. I (B.I)	PA474	31 May 1945	November 1973	Airworthy		
Supermarine Spitfire	Mk. Vb	AB910	July 1941	September 1965	Airworthy	Returned to flight in January 2026 for the first time since October 2023 after an extensive maintenance programme was completed at Biggin Hill.	
Supermarine Spitfire	LF Mk. IXe	MK356	1944	November 1997	Damaged/destroyed	Fatal crash in May 2024.	
Supermarine Spitfire	Mk. IIa	P7350	1940	5 November 1968	Airworthy		
Supermarine Spitfire	PR Mk. XIX	PM631	1945	11 July 1957	Airworthy	Flew again in October 2024 for the first time since 2021 after completing a major maintenance programme.	
Supermarine Spitfire	PR Mk. XIX	PS915	1945	11 July 1957	Maintenance	Under maintenance since July 2018. Its return was estimated for 2024, but as of May 2026, this still has not happened.	
Supermarine Spitfire	LF Mk. XVIe	TE311	1945	January 2000	Airworthy		
Hawker Hurricane	Mk. IIc	LF363	1 January 1944 ^{(first flew)}	July 1957	Airworthy		
Hawker Hurricane	Mk. IIc	PZ865	July 1944	March 1972	Airworthy		
Douglas Dakota	Mk. III (C-47A)	ZA947	March 1942	March 1993	Airworthy	Underwent maintenance from October 2022. Returned to flight for 2025 in a new SAEC scheme.	
de Havilland Canada DHC-1 Chipmunk	T.10	WK518	January 1952 ^{(entered service)}	April 1983	Airworthy		
de Havilland Canada DHC-1 Chipmunk	T.10	WG486	January 1952 ^{(entered service)}	1995	Airworthy		

Previous aircraft
Model	Mark	Registration	Built	Joined BBMF	Left BBMF	Fate	Notes	Refs
Supermarine Spitfire	PR Mk. XIX	PS853	1944	11 July 1957	1996	Sold to offset cost of LF363 re-build.	Remains airworthy. Operated by Rolls-Royce as G-RRGN (PS853 remains on livery).	

== History of the flight ==
=== Biggin Hill ===
In the years following the Second World War it became traditional for a Spitfire and Hurricane to lead the Victory Day flypast over London. From that event there grew the idea to form a historic collection of flyable aircraft, initially to commemorate the RAF's major battle honour, the Battle of Britain, and latterly with broadened scope, to commemorate the RAF's involvement in all the campaigns of the Second World War. Thus in July 1957 the Historic Aircraft Flight was formed at RAF Biggin Hill with one Hurricane (LF363) and three Mk XIX Spitfires (PM631, PS853 and PS915), in what, even then, had become a predominantly jet-powered air force.

There is evidence that at least one of the Spifires sometimes flew with a single Hawker Hunter F.5 of 41 Sqn (the last operational squadron to operate from RAF Biggin Hill) which co-resided with the Spitfires and Hurricane at that time. The two aircraft together were referred to in an official Biggin Hill "At Home" Day Display programme as the 'Battle of Britain Flight'.

=== Coltishall ===
The Battle of Britain Memorial Flight arrived at RAF Coltishall in Norfolk in April 1963, it was then known as the Historic Flight. From 1 April 1969 it was officially known as the Battle of Britain flight, becoming the Battle of Britain Memorial flight when the Lancaster joined the flight in 1973, a name it still holds.

The Flight moved from RAF Horsham St Faith, (now Norwich Airport) in April 1963, three years after the first English Electric Lightnings arrived and would stay until expansion of the SEPECAT Jaguar on the station. As the Jaguar force increased, and hangar space was needed, the flight moved to its current base RAF Coningsby.

It was at Coltishall that the flight became an established unit with dedicated manpower, previously it had been maintained by ad-hoc groundcrew of the relevant station flight. It was at RAF Coltishall the BBMF was truly born and expanded from two to seven Historic aircraft and a training Chipmunk.

=== Coningsby ===
BBMF moved to its present home at RAF Coningsby in 1976, since then it has acquired several more aircraft including, the first Chipmunk acquired in 1983, a Dakota was originally acquired in 1995, as a more reliable multi-engine trainer than the de Havilland Devon, that was nicknamed the 'Devon State Two', due to its tendency to return to the ground on an emergency state two; but has since taken a fuller role in BBMFs line up. The Spitfires and Hurricanes in the flight have varied over the years, as new aircraft are acquired and older ones passed to museums or used for parts.

=== Past and current BBMF homes ===
Over the years the BBMF have called many RAF bases "home". These include: Biggin Hill July 1957 – February 1958, North Weald February–May 1958, Martlesham Heath May 1958 – November 1961, Horsham St Faith November 1961 – April 1963, Coltishall April 1963 – March 1976 and RAF Coningsby since March 1976.

== Visitor Centre ==
The Battle of Britain Memorial Flight Visitor Centre is located at RAF Coningsby in Coningsby, Lincolnshire. A partnership between the Royal Air Force and Lincolnshire County Council, the centre allows visitors an up-close guided tour of the aircraft when not in use, as well as exhibits about the aircraft and other temporary exhibits.

The visitor centre was opened by Princess Margaret, Countess of Snowdon on Tuesday 30 June 1987, attended by the chairman of Lincolnshire County Council, Zena Scholey.

== Incidents and accidents ==
11 September 1991
Hawker Hurricane Mk. IIc LF363 (together with the Flight's Lancaster and a Spitfire) was en-route to Jersey from RAF Coningsby, when its engine suffered a camshaft failure. The pilot, Squadron Leader Allan Martin, subsequently elected to make an emergency landing at nearby RAF Wittering. While the aircraft was on final approach, it suffered a complete engine failure, stalled, and crashed onto the runway with the undercarriage retracted. On impact the aircraft caught fire and was severely damaged. The pilot escaped from the cockpit with a broken ankle and minor burns. The damaged aircraft was recovered back to Coningsby and stored for three years before it was decided to re-build it due to the rarity of airworthy examples of the type. LF363 was moved to Historic Flying Limited at Audley End Airfield, Essex where the re-build took place over the following four years. The Flight sold Supermarine Spitfire PR Mk. XIX PS853 in 1996 to offset the costs of the re-build. The aircraft flew again on 29 September 1998, flown by then Officer Commanding BBMF, Squadron Leader Paul Day OBE AFC. The aircraft returned to, and remains in, service with the BBMF.
7 May 2015
Avro Lancaster B Mk. I (B.I) PA474 suffered a fire on its number four engine during a training flight. The aircraft returned to RAF Coningsby using the three remaining engines, and the crew safely evacuated while the fire was extinguished. The aircraft remained grounded for much of the 2015 flying season while engineers replaced the Rolls-Royce Merlin engine and repaired the damaged components that surrounded it. The aircraft flew again on 12 October 2015, completing a successful test flight, and allowing it to return to service. The RAF also announced that with the ongoing major maintenance programme, the aircraft should remain airworthy until 2065.
25 July 2015
Hawker Hurricane Mk. IIc LF363 was conducting a flypast over Cadwell Park racing circuit, approximately 15 miles (25 kilometers) north-east of RAF Coningsby, when an oil pipe to the constant speed unit (a component of the aircraft's variable-pitch propeller) fractured, causing a major oil leak. The pilot, Squadron Leader Mark Discombe, flew the aircraft back to Coningsby, and safely executed an emergency landing with limited visibility after leaking oil covered parts of the aircraft's canopy and oil pressure at "critical levels". For his actions, Sqn Ldr Discombe was awarded the Air Force Cross in October 2016. It was his first season with the BBMF, and had only 30 hours flying the Hurricane at the time of the incident. The aircraft was repaired and returned to service.
11 May 2022
Flight Lieutenant Andy Preece MBE was preparing to land Supermarine Spitfire LF Mk. IXe MK356 back at RAF Coningsby after a successful flight test to verify the repair of an unrelated issue, when a faulty brake control valve caused the brake on the right main landing gear to become locked on. While landing, the pilot successfully corrected the aircraft's forward pitch momentum, caused by the friction of the locked wheel, to prevent a propeller strike. He also maintained directional control to keep the aircraft on the runway until it had slowed considerably. The aircraft came to a halt on the grass immediately adjacent the runway. An RAF crash vehicle had been waiting in this area until the pilot asked the fire crews to re-position to safer locations after predicting a runway excursion. After repairs to the faulty control valve and the undercarriage, MK356 returned to service. In recognition of his handling of the incident, Flt Lt Preece was awarded a Green Endorsement, the highest Air Safety award available.
25 May 2024
Supermarine Spitfire LF Mk. IXe MK356 crashed shortly after takeoff in a field off Langrick Road, to the east of RAF Coningsby. The sole pilot, Squadron Leader Mark Long, was killed in the accident. He had been a pilot with the team for four years, and was set to become Officer Commanding in October 2024. Along with a BBMF Hawker Hurricane, the aircraft was due to display at the Lincolnshire Aviation Heritage Centre in East Kirkby, Lincolnshire as a part of the centre's "Lanc, Tank and Military Machines" event. The RAF later announced they had temporarily grounded all BBMF aircraft while investigations into the accident take place. In a statement, the BBMF confirmed that their visitor centre had reopened on 26 June 2024, and that their public relations team would be present on the ground at airshows and other events while the aircraft are grounded. On 20 July 2024, the Flight announced that Supermarine Spitfire LF Mk. XVIe TE311 had been repainted to display the fictitious squadron code "L-NG" on its starboard (right) side, along with Sqn Ldr Long's name and rank pennant under the cockpit. A fundraiser was set up to raise £15,000 to support the pilot's family and to establish a flying scholarship for disabled individuals in his name through the charity Flying Scholarships for Disabled People. Its target was reached on 20 July 2024. The organisers said that additional funds would be donated to two local charities selected by his family – LIVES and Lincolnshire & Nottinghamshire Air Ambulance. On 22 July 2024, the BBMF announced that Avro Lancaster B Mk. I PA474 was "ready to fly again" after completing pre-planned winter 2023 maintenance, and was subsequently awarded Public Display Authority (PDA) on 6 August. The Flight stated that their Supermarine Spitfires and Hawker Hurricanes remained grounded while investigations into the crash continued.

== See also ==
- Historic Army Aircraft Flight, Stockbridge, Hampshire, UK
- Royal Navy Historic Flight (defunct)
- Air Force Heritage Flight of New Zealand
- No. 100 Squadron RAAF
