= W. A. S. Butement =

New Zealand-born British-Australian defence scientist and public servant

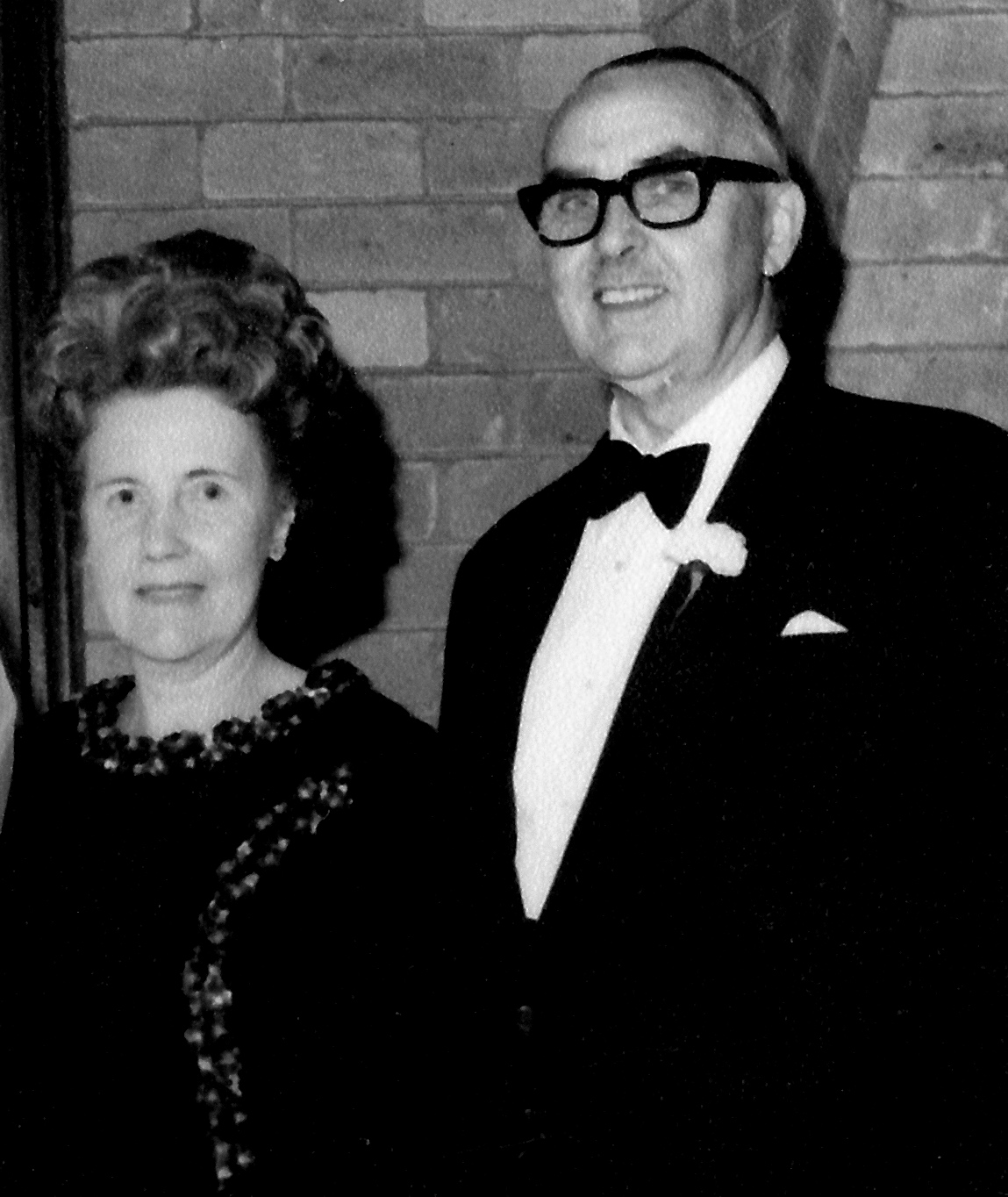
- Ursula and Alan Butement (1971)

Chief Defence Scientist of Australia
- In office 1949–1967
- Succeeded by: Arthur Wills

Personal details
- Born: William Alan Stewart Butement; 18 August 1904 Masterton, New Zealand
- Died: 25 January 1990 (aged 85) Richmond, Victoria
- Resting place: Andersons Creek Cemetery, Warrandyte, Victoria
- Spouse: Ursula Florence Alberta Parish (m. 1933)
- Children: 2d
- Education: University College London (BSc., 1926); University of Adelaide (DSc., 1961)
- Known for: Invention of the Proximity fuse
- Awards: Officer of the Order of the British Empire (1946); Commander of the Order of the British Empire (1959)

William Alan Stewart Butement CBE (18 August 1904 – 25 January 1990) was a New Zealand-born British-Australian defence scientist and public servant. A native of New Zealand, he made extensive contributions to radar development in Great Britain during World War II and was one of the inventors of the proximity fuse. He designed the Wireless Set No. 11 and invented and supervised the development of the Wireless Set No. 10, a secure radio-based method of communication to replace the traditional telephone cable.

Butement returned to Australia in 1947 to help set up the Anglo-Australian rocket test range at Woomera, South Australia. He then became the first Chief Defence Scientist of Australia. As head of the Weapons Research Establishment, he oversaw the development of the Malkara anti-tank guided missile, the Ikara anti-submarine missile and the Barra sonar buoy. He also continued his association with radar, sponsoring research into what eventually became the Jindalee over-the-horizon radar. He ended his professional career with a research position in private business.

== Early life ==
William Alan Stewart Butement was born in Masterton, New Zealand, on 18 August 1904, the oldest of five children of William Butement, a physician and surgeon, and his wife Amy Louise Stewart. When Alan was age eight, the family moved to Sydney, where he started at The Scots College. After the outbreak of the First World War, his father tried to enlist in the First Australian Imperial Force as a medical officer but was rejected as being too old. The family therefore moved again, this time to London, England, where his father was able to join the British Army. Alan graduated from University College School in 1922. He then entered University College London, where he studied medicine for a year before switching to science. He graduated with a Bachelor of Science degree with a first class pass in chemistry in 1926.

== Achievements in Great Britain ==
After graduation, Butement worked at Ealing Studios as a research assistant with DeForest Phonofilm. In 1928, he joined the War Office's Signals Experimental Establishment at Woolwich, London, as a Scientific Officer, developing radio equipment for the British Army. He worked on a Doctor of Philosophy thesis under the supervision of Alfred William Porter, but the degree was never awarded due to Porter's death on 11 January 1939. Butement and an associate, P. E. Pollard, conceived a radio apparatus for the detection of ships. A breadboard test unit, operating at 50 cm (600 MHz) and using pulsed modulation, gave successful laboratory results, but was not of interest to War Office officials. Nevertheless, in January 1931, a writeup on the apparatus was entered in the Inventions Book maintained by the Royal Engineers. This is the first official record in Great Britain of the technology that would eventually become radar. Butement married Ursula Florence Alberta Parish on 17 June 1933 at the St Philip and All Saints Church in North Sheen, Surrey. They had two daughters, Ann and Jane.

In October 1936, Robert Watson Watt's team from the Air Ministry began work on what would become Chain Home (CH). By 1936 they had moved to the Bawdsey Manor Research Centre (on the North Sea coast) and had already begun plans for deployment of the CH system. Referred to as Range and Direction Finding (RDF), Bawdsey had by this time begun branching out, forming teams to design and build all sorts of radar related devices. An Army Cell from the SEE was attached to the Bawdsey operation. Butement joined the team in 1938 as a senior scientific officer. At Bawdsey, Butement was assigned to develop a Coastal Defence (CD) RDF system to be used for aiming anti-shipping and anti-aircraft guns. By early 1938, he had a prototype under test. This used a pulsed 1.5 m (200 MHz) transmitter producing 50 kW power, (later increased to 150 kW). For the transmitting and receiving antennas, he developed a large dipole array, 3.0 metres (10 ft) high and 7.3 metres (24 ft) wide, giving narrow transmitting and receiving beams. This array could be rotated at a speed around 1.5 revolutions per minute. To improve the directional accuracy, lobe switching was used in the transmitting array. As a part of this development, he formulated the first – at least in Great Britain – mathematical relationship that became known as the radar range equation. He also designed the Wireless Set No. 11.

In September 1939, at the start of the Second World War, operations at Bawdsey were distributed to safer locations. The Army Cell joined the Air Defence Experimental Establishment (ADEE) at Christchurch, Dorset, on the south coast. At the time of the move, Butement was named an Assistant Director of Scientific Research, and continued to lead the Coastal Defence (CD) research activity.The primary use of the evolving CD system was in aiming searchlights associated with the anti-aircraft guns, and he acquired the nickname of "Mr Searchlight Radar". He developed what became the standard method of determining miss-distance of gunfire against shipping by using RDF echoes from splashes caused by shells hitting the sea. The ADEE was merged into the Air Defence Research and Development Establishment (ADRDE) in 1941. Applications of the CD system and the work of Butement were even more important as microwave devices were added. Germany began bomber attacks on the British mainland, and it was decided that radar research and development activities would be moved further inland. In May 1942, the ADRDE was transferred to Malvern, Worcestershire, where it remained for many years. It was renamed the Radar Research and Development Establishment in 1944.

There was an urgent need to improve the effectiveness of the anti-aircraft guns. With his background in radio, in October 1939, Butement turned to this technology as a potential solution. He conceived of a highly compact RDF set placed on the projectile, setting off the detonation when close proximity to the target was attained. He completed the circuit design, but there was the problem of packaging such a device in a small projectile, as well as the question of the vacuum tubes surviving the acceleration forces at firing. The demands on personnel and funds at the start of the war were such that little more was done at that time. In September 1940, Butement's concept was moved dramatically toward mass production when it was exported under the technology transfer arrangements of the Tizard Mission, and subsequently a variation of his circuit became adopted in the United States as the proximity fuse or VT (variable-time) fuse. In the later stages of the war, anti-aircraft shells fitted with proximity fuses played a major part in defeating both German V-1 flying bomb attacks on London, and Japanese kamikaze attacks on Allied shipping. The British government filed a patent on the VT fuse in April 1942 and the Americans filed one in September 1943. After the war there was litigation over credit for the invention before Justice Alexander Holtzoff awarded it for the invention to Butement and his collaborators, Edward Samuel Shire and Amherst Thomson, on 18 August 1967.

In 1942, Butement, who became Assistant Director of Scientific Research with the Ministry of Supply in 1940, invented and supervised the development of a secure radio-based method of battlefield communication using narrow beams of pulsed microwave signals, to replace the traditional telephone cable. Using a 10 cm (3 GHz) transmitter and receiver developed for radar, the Wireless Set No. 10 evolved. This was the first multi-channel, microwave communication system in Great Britain. It first went operational in July 1944, just after D-Day, and served as the central communications backbone for the 1944–1945 campaign in North West Europe. Field Marshal Sir Bernard Montgomery used it to communicate between the 21st Army Group and the War Office in London.

For his wartime work, Butement was honoured as an Officer of the Order of the British Empire and awarded £10,000 by the British Awards to Inventors Committee.

== Achievements in Australia ==
After the War, the British and Australian governments established a joint project on research and development of guided missiles. The project included laboratory and workshop facilities at Salisbury, South Australia, and a rocket test range at a new town, Woomera, South Australia, in the Australian Outback. Butement was selected as the project's assistant director of scientific research under Albert Rowe. He embarked for Australia with his family on the RMS Asturias on 7 February 1947, arriving in Melbourne on 11 March. They then took a train to Adelaide.

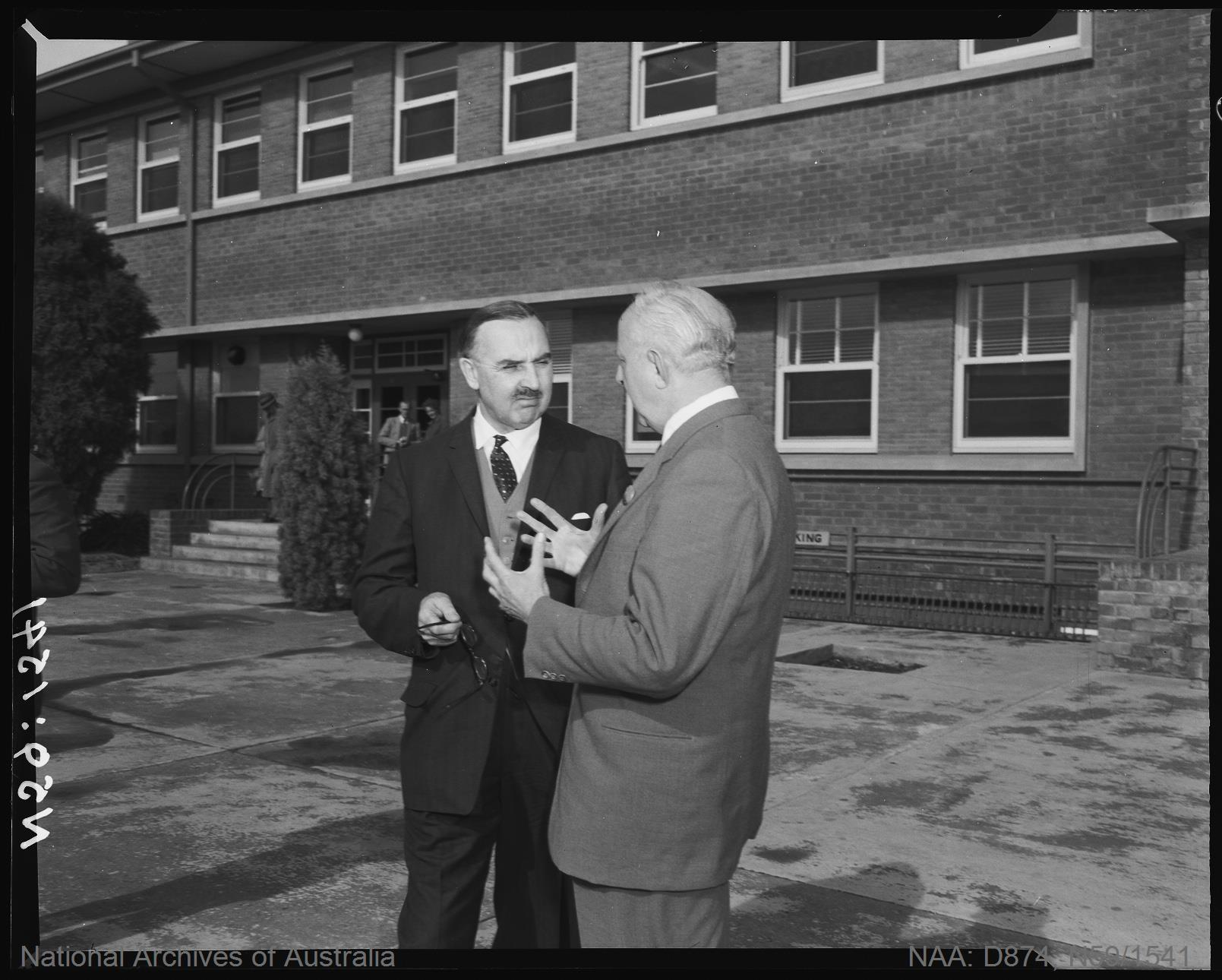
Alan Butement (left) and David Forbes Martyn in 1959

Butement was appointed Chief Superintendent of the project in October 1948. In April 1949, Butement took a new position as the first Chief Scientist in the Defence Scientific Service of the Australian Department of Supply and Development. His responsibilities encompassed laboratories for high-speed aerodynamics, propulsion, and electronics, all closely linked with the Anglo-Australian joint project. In 1955, all of these activities, including the joint project, were merged to form the Weapons Research Establishment (WRE) reporting to Butement in Melbourne.

Under Butement, the WRE established working facilities and conditions highly suited for scientific research. Hundreds of university graduates were recruited and sent to Great Britain for research training. Butement encouraged the WRE to establish working links with scientists and engineers at the University of Adelaide. In this, he personally submitted a thesis describing his principal contributions to defence technologies and was awarded the Doctor of Science degree in 1961.

While by this time Butement was primarily a research administrator rather than a hands-on scientist, he did personally initiate several highly important developments, including a rocket engine that used a semi-solid paste pressed into the firing chamber as propellant. The Malkara missile was an anti-tank guided missile that was adopted as standard equipment by the Australian and British armies. The Ikara was a ship-launched anti-submarine missile that launched an American Mark 44 acoustic torpedo that remained in service with the Royal Australian Navy until 1982. Another concept he developed was the Barra sonar buoy, which saw service with the Royal Australian Air Force and the British Royal Air Force. He also continued his association with radar, sponsoring research into what eventually developed into the Jindalee over-the-horizon radar. In a 1961 paper, he proposed the use of ultrasound to scan sections of the human body.

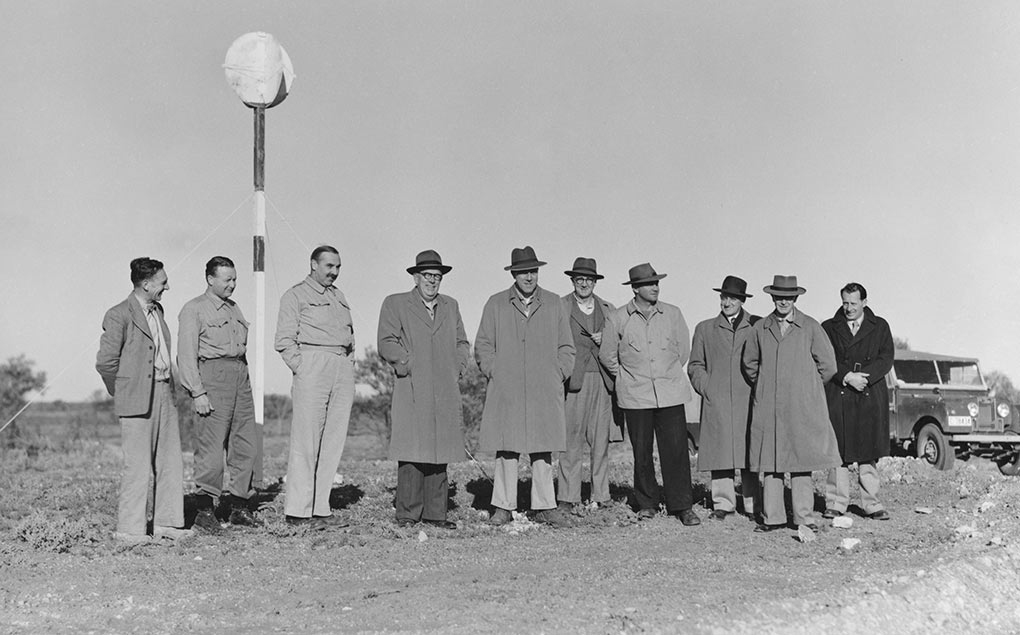
Maralinga Committee visits the site. Butement is third from the left.

Butement played a leading role in British nuclear weapons tests in Australia. He led the party that identified the Monte Bello Islands in Western Australia and Emu Field in South Australia as suitable sites, and was one of three observers representing the Australian Government at atomic tests on these sites in 1952 and 1953, respectively. Another mainland site, at Maralinga, South Australia, was later selected, and Butement was a member of the board that managed the construction of this site, and was also a member of the test safety committee preparing for detonations there in 1956 and 1957.

In the 1959 New Year Honours, Butement was promoted to Commander of the Order of the British Empire. The impending relocation of the Department of Supply to Canberra in 1967 prompted Butement to resign his position with the WRE on 2 December 1966, as he did not want to move away from Melbourne. He accepted a five-year term as director of research for Plessey Pacific, the Australian subsidiary of Plessey, a major British electronics manufacturer. In 1969 he submitted a paper to the Australian Industrial Research Group, advocating the formation of an Australian academy of applied science. From this, the Australian Academy of Technological Sciences and Engineering was formed in 1975. Butement, a member of both the steering committee and the council of the new academy, was appointed a foundation fellow in 1978 and became an honorary fellow on 10 October 1979.

After retirement from Plessey in 1972, Butement remained in Melbourne where he was an enthusiastic amateur radio (ham) operator (call sign VK3AD) and an adept carpenter, metalworker, and mechanic. He was a committed Christian, adhering to the Catholic Apostolic Church and later the Anglican Church. As a religious fundamentalist, he struggled to reconcile the Big Bang physical theory with Book of Genesis. He died on 25 January 1990, in Richmond, Victoria Melbourne and was and was buried in Andersons Creek Cemetery in Warrandyte, Victoria.

== Recognition ==
- The Butement Laboratory of the High Frequency Radar Division at the Department of Defence's Weapons Research Establishment in Salisbury, South Australia was named in his honour.
- The main village square in the town of Woomera in the outback of South Australia is named "Butement Square" in his honour.

== Reference notes ==
Government offices
New title	Chief Defence Scientist of Australia; 1949–1967	Succeeded by Arthur Wills
