= Harry Diamond Laboratories =

Defunct research facility of the United States Army

Coordinates: 39.027860°N 76.963809°W

- Adelphi, Maryland in the United States
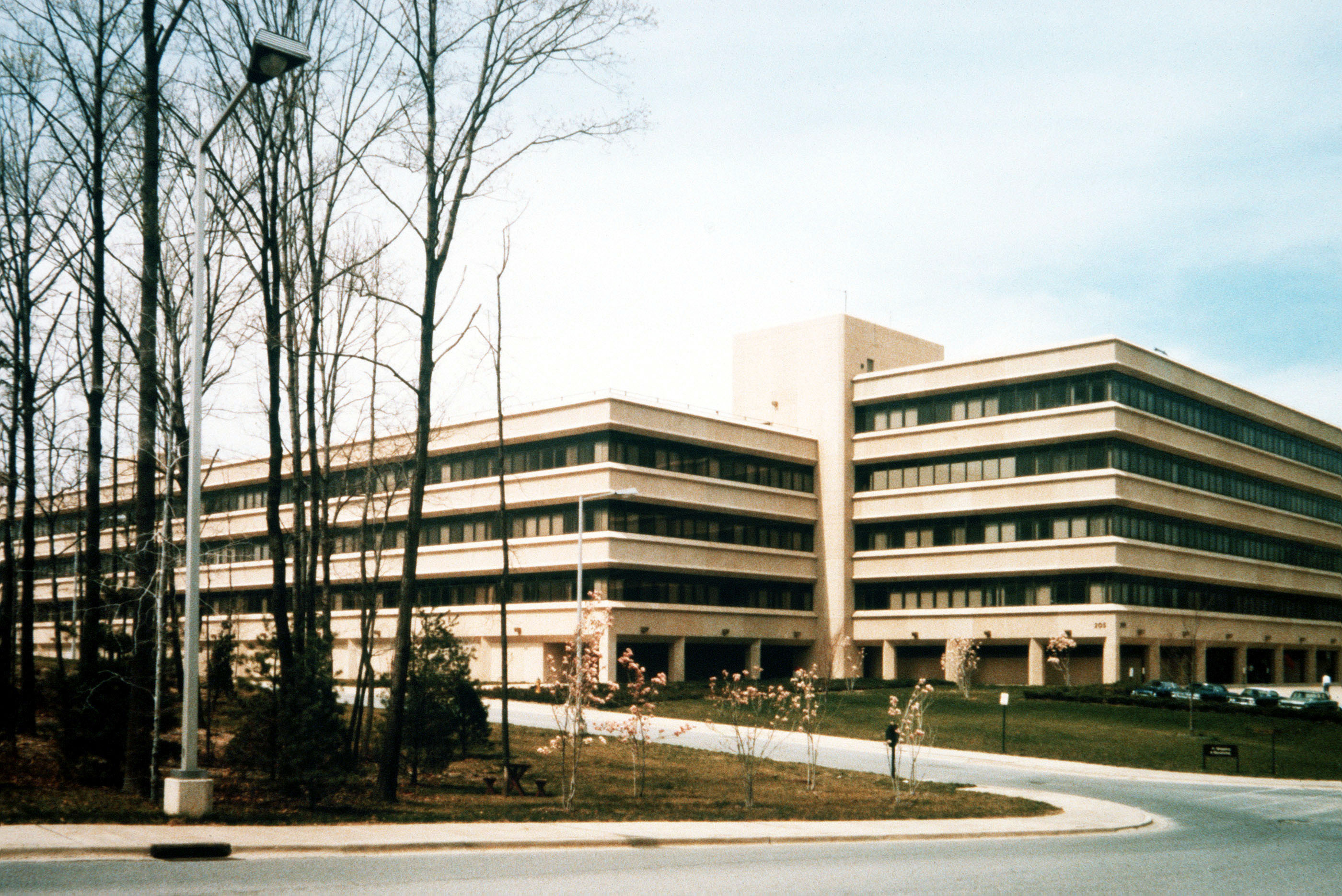
- The Harry Diamond Laboratories building complex, which now houses the headquarters of the U.S. Army Research Laboratory.

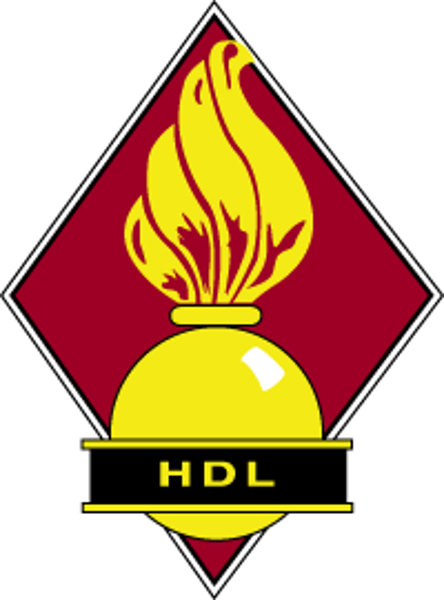
- Harry Diamond Laboratories emblem.

Site information
- Type: Military research laboratory
- Owner: Department of Defense
- Operator: U.S. Army
- Controlled by: Army Materiel Command
- Condition: Redeveloped as part of the U.S. Army Research Laboratory

Site history
- Built: 1949 (as Harry Diamond Ordnance Laboratory)

The Harry Diamond Laboratories (HDL) was a research facility under the National Bureau of Standards (NBS) and later the U.S. Army. It conducted research and development in electronic components and devices and was at one point the largest electronics research and development laboratory in the U.S. Army. HDL also acted as the Army's lead laboratory in nuclear survivability studies and operated the Aurora Pulsed Radiation Simulator, the world's largest full-threat gamma radiation simulator. In 1992, HDL was disestablished, and its mission, personnel, and facilities were incorporated into the newly created U.S. Army Research Laboratory (ARL). As part of this transition, the Army designated the HDL building as the site of ARL's new headquarters.

The installation was named in honor of pioneer radio engineer and inventor Harry Diamond, who led the Ordnance Development Division during World War II. Diamond contributed greatly to the fundamental concept and design of proximity fuzes.

== History ==
=== Under the National Bureau of Standards ===
The origins of the Harry Diamond Laboratories trace back to the development of the radio proximity fuze at the National Bureau of Standards (NBS). During the 1930s, British military researchers investigated the feasibility of a proximity fuze, a device that would detonate an explosive charge only when it approached the immediate vicinity of its target. At the time, conventional artillery and antiaircraft shells very rarely hit their target, especially a moving one, because their detonation either required direct contact or relied on accurate predictions with an altimeter or a timer set at launch.

In 1939, British researchers William Butement, Edward Shire, and Amherst Thomson at the Air Defense Experimental Establishment conceived of a proximity fuze that used radio waves to sense the proximity of the target. While Butement and his team were able to construct and crudely test a prototype fuze in 1940, the high production demands of World War II ultimately stalled its development. As a result, the British decided to share their research on the project with the United States in hopes that the U.S. could complete the technology. In September 1940, Sir John Cockcroft delivered all available information about the radio proximity fuze to the newly formed National Defense Research Committee (NDRC) as part of the Tizard Mission. The chairman of NDRC, Vannevar Bush, appointed Merle Tuve, the director of the Department of Terrestrial Magnetism at the Carnegie Institution for Science, to lead the U.S. research on proximity fuzes.

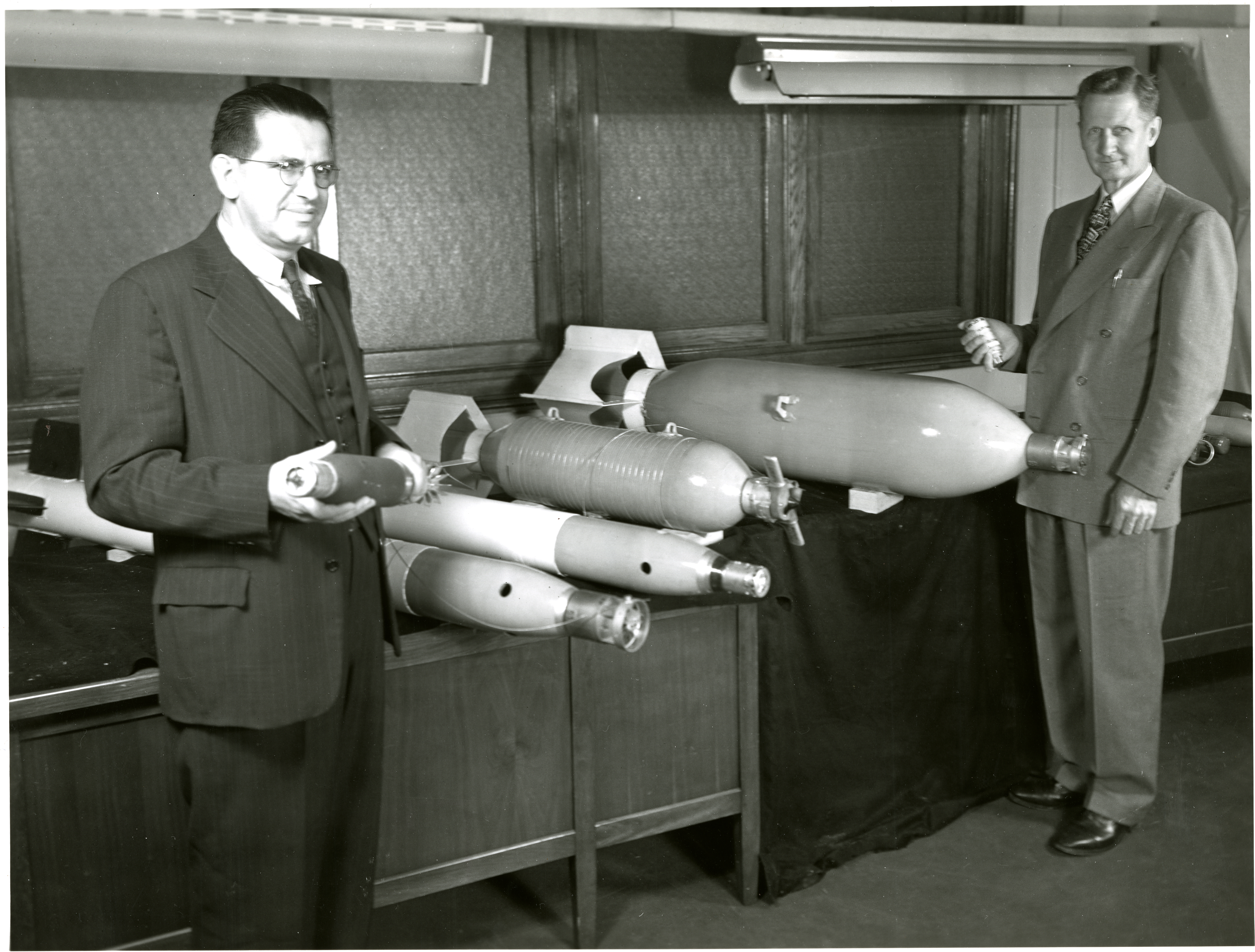
Harry Diamond (left) and Alexander Ellett (right) with examples of their proximity fuze.

By November 1940, Tuve recognized that two types of radio proximity fuzes were needed: one for rotating projectiles and one for non-rotating projectiles. The former was sought by the U.S. Navy for anti-aircraft guns, while the latter was best suited for U.S. Army and U.S. Air Force weapons such as bombs, rockets, and mortars. The team headed by Tuve at the Carnegie Institution, which later moved to the Applied Physics Laboratory at Johns Hopkins University in 1942, took on the development of the radio proximity fuze for rotating projectiles. Meanwhile, the development of the radio proximity fuze for non-rotating projectiles was assigned to Harry Diamond and Wilford Hinman Jr. at the NBS and overseen by Alexander Ellett of NDRC.

Diamond, who was the chief of NBS's radio and photoelectric fuze groups, determined that utilizing the Doppler effect would provide the best results for a proximity fuze in a non-rotating projectile. Diamond and Hinman subsequently developed a diode detector system that activated when the amplitude of the reflected radio waves exceeded a predetermined value. In April and May 1941, Diamond's group tested a series of crude box models based on this principle in successful bomb drops against water targets. While only a third of the models functioned properly during the tests, the experiment demonstrated that Diamond and Hinman's idea had potential. Diamond and his team spent the next several months working on the fuze's electronic circuits and safety mechanisms.

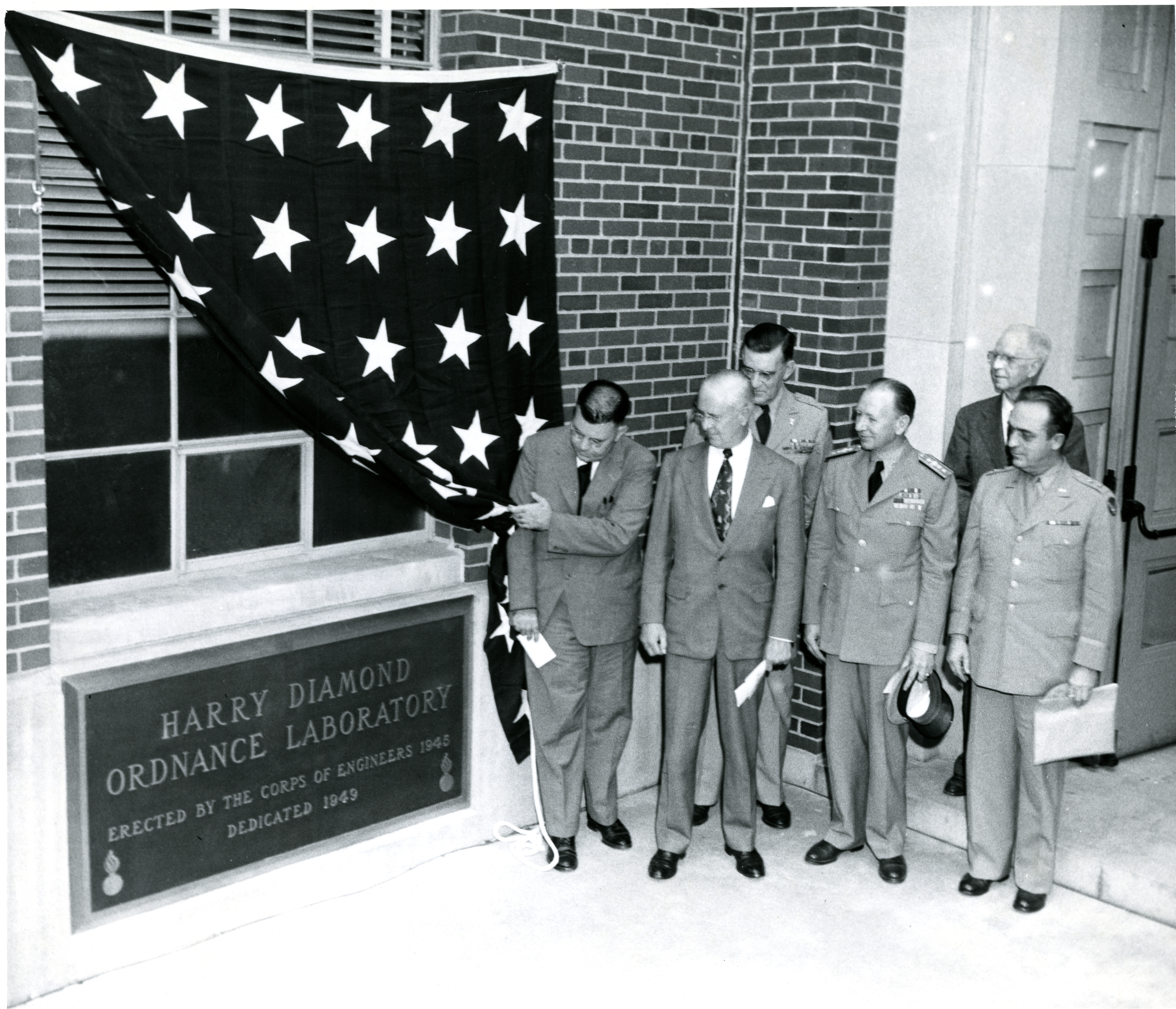
Dedication of the Harry Diamond Ordnance Laboratory in 1949.

In May 1942, the U.S. Army made its first urgent request for a proximity fuze for the new 4.5-inch airborne rocket against the German Luftwaffe. Once the dimensions for the fuze were decided, Diamond's team completed the fuze design in 2 days. After testing was conducted in June 1942, NBS constructed more than a thousand fuzes based on this design using the small-scale production lines in its model shops. The U.S. Army later produced almost 400,000 of NBS's fuzes in 1943 and an additional 400,000 were made before the end of the war. Due to the expansion of fuze-related activities at NBS, the Bureau established the Ordnance Development Division in December 1942. The new division initially consisted of 200 people working on proximity fuzes for rockets and bombs with Diamond acting as the division chief. By the end of the war, the size of the division had doubled.

After the war, a large laboratory complex designed to house the Bureau's Ordnance Development Division, Ordnance Electronics Division, and Electromechanical Division was established in 1946. Meanwhile, Diamond continued to lead the Ordnance Development Division until his death in 1948. In honor of his work, the laboratory complex was renamed to the Harry Diamond Ordnance Laboratory in 1949.

=== Under the U.S. Army ===
NBS underwent significant restructuring and downsizing in the years following World War II. During this time period, several wartime programs managed by the Bureau were relocated elsewhere. One of the major causes of this organizational change was a congressional report by the Kelly Committee following the AD-X2 battery additive controversy during the early 1950s. The Kelly Committee, which was formed by the NBS Visiting Committee and the National Academy of Sciences at the request of Commerce Secretary Charles Sinclair Weeks, advised NBS to return to non-military research and testing and transfer its weapons programs to the Department of Defense.

As part of the transition, the majority of the Harry Diamond Ordnance Laboratory was transferred to the U.S. Army in September 1953 and renamed the Diamond Ordnance Fuze Laboratory (DOFL). Despite the change in command, however, the laboratory's operations remained at the original building complex in Washington, D.C. Hinman Jr., who had succeeded Diamond as the head of the program after Diamond's death, became DOFL's first technical director after it moved to the Army.

As an element of the Army's Ordnance Corps, DOFL focused its research and development efforts on proximity fuzes and other related items. Areas that received attention included printed circuits, microminiaturization, casting resins, flow and temperature measuring systems, reserve power supplies, high-resolution radar, air navigation systems, and telemetering equipment. DOFL was also responsible for determining the susceptibility of ordnance electronics materiel to nuclear radiation and investigating methods of radiation hardening. When the U.S. Army Materiel Command (AMC) was established during the 1962 Army reorganization, DOFL was assigned directly to AMC as a corporate laboratory. The following year, DOFL had its name officially changed to the Harry Diamond Laboratories (HDL).

During the 1960s, the U.S. Army made plans to relocate HDL after a joint Army and Navy study group recommended that the laboratory be moved to a 137-acre site adjacent to the U.S. Naval Ordnance Laboratory in Adelphi, Maryland. Consisting mostly of undeveloped farmland, the site was acquired by the U.S. Army in 1969, and construction of HDL's new facilities began shortly afterwards. In July 1971, HDL also acquired AMC's Woodbridge Research Facility along with roughly 642 acres of land in Woodbridge, Virginia to use as a satellite site. Initiated in May 1970, this acquisition was a move by the Army to consolidate AMC's nuclear weapons effects research and test activities. As a result, the U.S. Army Mobility Equipment Research and Development Command (MERADCOM)'s Electromagnetic Effects Laboratory was relocated from Fort Belvoir Engineer Proving Ground to Woodbridge in September 1971. As a satellite facility of HDL, the Woodbridge Research Facility primarily conducted investigations into the simulated effects of electromagnetic pulses generated by nuclear detonation on electronic systems. Following the cessation of nuclear detonation testing, the simulations produced by the facility enabled the Army to test the vulnerability of tactical systems to the effects of nuclear attack and gather data for the development of hardening techniques.

In 1973, operations at HDL were officially moved from Washington, D.C. at Connecticut Ave. and Van Ness St. to the newly constructed research complex in Adelphi, Maryland. HDL employees were moved to Adelphi as part of a three-phase relocation program as different sections of the facility underwent construction. In November 1973, about 500 of the total employees were moved to the H-shaped Adelphi complex. The second phase took place in 1974 with about 400 employees, and the remaining 500 workers were moved in the fall of 1975. In 1980, the Army acquired the Blossom Point Field Test Facility in Charles County, Maryland, and assigned it to HDL as its second satellite installation. Consisting of 20 buildings, the Blossom Point facility was used by HDL to conduct field tests on HDL-developed fuzes, explosive and pyrotechnic devices, and electronic telemetry systems. Construction of HDL's Adelphi complex reached completion in 1983, by which point the site housed a total of 22 structures.

In 1992, HDL was among the seven Army laboratories that were consolidated to form the U.S. Army Research Laboratory (ARL) following the Base Realignment and Closure (BRAC) commission in 1991. In addition, the Adelphi research complex was renamed the Adelphi Laboratory Center and became the headquarters for ARL. While HDL's Blossom Point satellite facility was transferred under ARL, the Woodbridge satellite facility was ultimately closed.

== Research ==
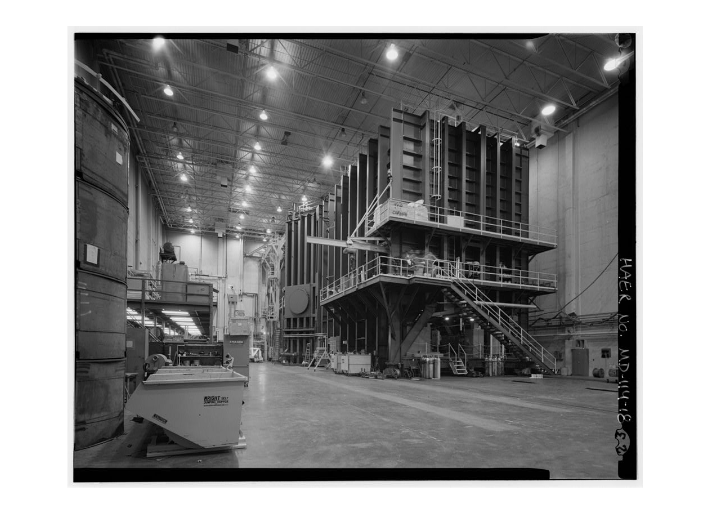
The Aurora Pulsed Radiation Simulator, the first gamma radiation simulator of its size and capacity built in the world, was in operation from 1971 to 1996.

At its inception, the Harry Diamond Ordnance Laboratory was originally established to further advance U.S. research and development in electronic fuzing for rockets, mortars, artillery, and missiles. Over time, the laboratory's principal activities expanded significantly to include other ordnance specialties such as radar technology, integrated circuits, nuclear survivability, and basic research in the physical sciences. By the 1980s, the Harry Diamond Laboratories was the largest electronics R&D laboratory in the U.S. Army and represented the Army's lead laboratory for the study of nuclear effects. Since 1971, the facility housed and operated the Aurora Pulsed Radiation Simulator, which was the world's largest gamma radiation simulator at the time. Before it was decommissioned and disassembled in 1996, the Aurora Simulator had conducted a total of 287 numbered tests. HDL also operated the Army's largest facility for designing, fabricating, and testing integrated circuits.

HDL consisted of four specialized laboratories, each headed by its own director: the Advanced Research Laboratory, the Systems Research Laboratory, the Research and Development Laboratory, and the Components Research Laboratory. The Advanced Research Laboratory specialized in exploratory systems, special components, optical systems, and physical research. The Systems Research Laboratory specialized in radio systems, nuclear vulnerability and countermeasures, microwave components, systems feasibility, fluid amplifiers, applied physics, and computation and analysis. The Research and Development Laboratory specialized in projectile fuzes, missile fuzes, and heavy artillery fuzes as well as limited warfare weapons, electronic timers, safety devices, parachute opening devices, fluid systems, large radar systems, telemetry, air defense, and missile trajectory measuring systems. Lastly, the Components Research Laboratory specialized in materials and techniques, microminiaturization, tubes, and power supplies. The technologies developed by these laboratories, if applicable, would be prepared for mass production by HDL's Engineering Division, which was responsible for quality assurance, test engineering, value analysis, and industrial support.

== Projects ==
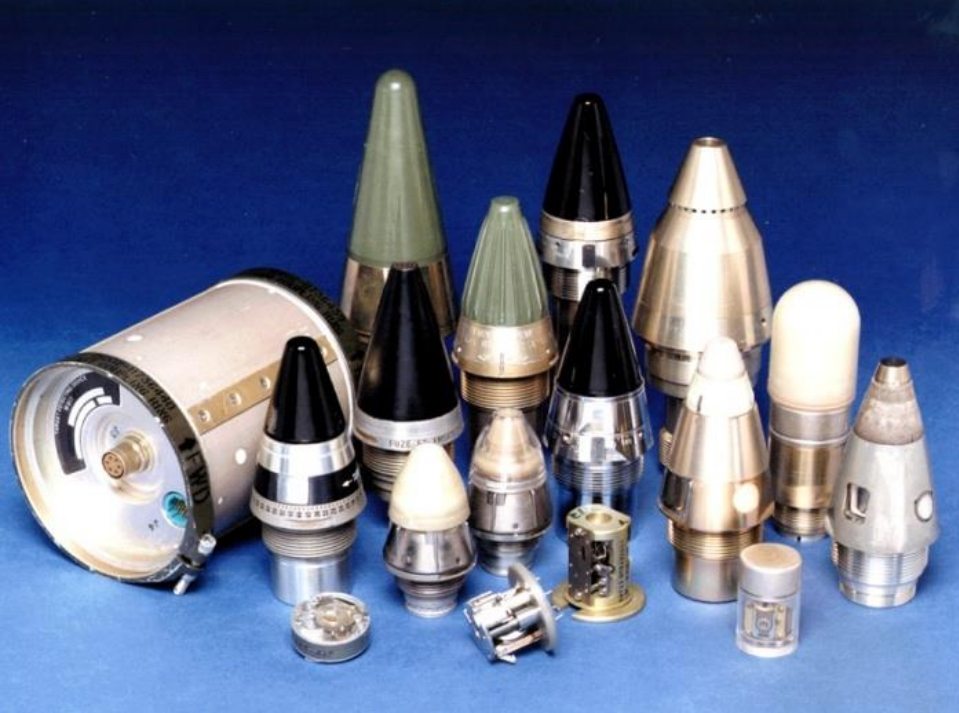
Fuzes.

As an early authority on electronic fuze technology, the Harry Diamond Laboratories contributed to the development of not only the proximity fuze but many other fuze systems including the following:

- Cigarette Fuze: A short-range fuze for near-surface-burst missiles.
- Copperhead: A lightweight fuzing system weighing about 15 lbs.
- Firefly: A T320-type fuze for M56 Scorpion rounds.
- FZU-24/B Bomb Fuze Initiator: A proximity fuzing system for general purpose bombs.
- M445 Fuze: A time fuze developed for the M270 Multiple Launch Rocket System.
- M530 Fuze: A fuze developed to replace the M509 fuze for the M371 90-mm recoilless rifle round.
- M607 Fuze: A fuze developed for the M21 antitank landmine.
- M734 Fuze: A fuze developed for the M224 60-mm Lightweight Company Mortar System.

HDL also designed and developed fuzes for the following missiles:

- AIM-7 Sparrow: A medium-range, homing air-to-air missile system.
- Davy Crockett Weapon System: A tactical nuclear recoilless smoothbore gun.
- IM-99 Bomarc: A long-range surface-to-air missile used during the Cold War.
- MGM-5 Corporal: The Army's first operational guided missile and the first U.S. guided missile system to be approved for nuclear armament.
- MGM-29 Sergeant: A short-range, surface-to-surface missile.
- MGM-31 Pershing: A short-range ballistic missile system.
- MGM-52 Lance: A mobile field artillery tactical surface-to-surface missile system.
- MGR-1 Honest John: The first nuclear-capable surface-to-surface rocket in the U.S. arsenal.
- MGR-3 Little John: The smallest nuclear-capable rocket deployed by the U.S. Army.
- MIM-23 Hawk: A medium-range, surface-to-air missile system.
- MIM-46 Mauler: A mobile, short-range missile system.
- MIM-72 Chaparral: A mobile surface-to-air missile system.
- MIM-104 Patriot: A mobile surface-to-air missile system capable of intercepting incoming tactical ballistic missiles.
- PGM-11 Redstone: A short-range ballistic missile used during the Cold War.
- PGM-19 Jupiter: The first nuclear-armed, medium-range ballistic missile of the U.S. Air Force.

HDL either led or was involved in the development of numerous technologies, including the following:

- Automatic step-and-repeat camera: A device used in photolithography to manufacture integrated circuits; also known as a stepper. HDL developed the first stepper that was completely automatic.
- Fluidics: The use of the physical properties of liquids or gases to perform analog or digital operations. The science of fluid amplification began at HDL. HDL applications of fluid amplification include the Army Artificial Heart Pump and the Army Emergency Respirator.
- High-Spin Tabletop Artillery Simulator: A device used to test fuze power supplies, such as that of the M732 fuze, by simulating the forces in an artillery tube.
- Lunar penetrometer: A tool used to measure the load-bearing characteristics of the moon in preparation for spacecraft landings. HDL developed the omnidirectional accelerometer for the lunar penetrometer.
- M1A1 Abrams tank: A main battle tank of the U.S. Army. HDL developed an auxiliary power unit for the M1A1 tank to extend the tank's battery life.
- Photolithography: The process of using light to etch circuit patterns on light-sensitive substrates for integrated circuit manufacturing.
- Tactical nuclear slide rule: A tool used to calculate the blast effects and damage resulting from detonating a nuclear weapon.
- W48: A nuclear artillery shell that can be fired from any standard 155-mm howitzer. HDL contributed to its design and development alongside Picatinny Arsenal, Frankford Arsenal, and the U.S. Army Materials Research Agency.

== See also ==
- Atmospheric Sciences Laboratory (ASL)
- Ballistic Research Laboratory (BRL)
- Electronics Technology and Devices Laboratory (ETDL)
- Human Engineering Laboratory (HEL)
- Materials Technology Laboratory (MTL)
- Vulnerability Assessment Laboratory (VAL)
