= Zelda Fichandler =

American stage producer, director and educator

Zelda Fichandler (née Diamond; September 18, 1924 – July 29, 2016) was an American stage producer, director and educator.

== Life and career ==
Zelda Fichandler came from a family that emigrated from Russia when she was an infant. Her father, Harry Diamond, was a scientist who helped develop proximity fuses. Zelda pursued sciences until the day she spilled hydrochloric acid down her shirt and burned herself, when she decided to pursue acting instead.

At age 4, she moved from the Boston area to Washington, D.C., when her father accepted a job at the National Bureau of Standards. Aged 8, she performed as Helga in Helga and the White Peacock at the Rose Robison Cowen’s Studio for Children's Theatre.

In 1950, her husband, Thomas C. Fichandler (August 9, 1915 – March 16, 1997), and Edward Mangum, a professor of theater at George Washington University and Zelda's teacher, cofounded the Arena Stage in Washington. It was the city's first integrated theater, hiring actors and performers regardless of race or color.

Arena Stage was first located at the Hippodrome, a tiny former art-film cinema at Ninth Street and New York Avenue NW. The company’s first production was Oliver Goldsmith’s eighteenth-century comedy “She Stoops to Conquer”. The theatre's productions became influential: The Great White Hope (1967), Indians (1969), Moonchildren (1971), Tintypes (1979). As the company’s audience grew, the theatre moved to "The Old Vat Theatre" which the company created in an abandoned distillery on the Potomac riverside. In 1961, the company commissioned a purpose-built theater complex on Maine Avenue SW, designed by Harry Weese, designer of Washington, D.C.'s Metro system. An addition was made in 1972.

Zelda Fichandler served as Arena's artistic director until her retirement at the end of the 1990–91 season. During that time, Arena Stage became known as one of America's premier regional theatres. In 1961, she was directed Howard Sackler’s interracial drama “The Great White Hope,” which starred then-newcomers James Earl Jones and Jane Alexander. It was the first play to start as a regional theatre production, then transfer to Broadway. The Broadway performance won the Tony Award and the Pulitzer Prize for Drama. The Arena Stage in 1976 also won the Tony for Outstanding Regional Theatre. In 1973, Arena Stage became the first regional theatre chosen by the U.S. Department of State to perform in the Soviet Union, where they presented their production of Inherit the Wind.

Fichandler directed numerous plays at Arena Stage including Death of a Salesman, Uncle Vanya, A Doll's House and Six Characters in Search of an Author. Several of her Arena Stage productions toured internationally, including Inherit the Wind and The Crucible.

From 1984 until 2009, Fichandler was chair of the graduate acting program and Master Teacher of Acting and Directing at the Tisch School of the Arts at New York University. From 1991–94, she was artistic director of The Acting Company.

Her honors and awards include a Common Wealth Award for distinguished service in the dramatic arts (1985), a Helen Hayes Award for directing The Crucible (1988); and a National Medal of Arts in 1996. She was inducted into the American Theatre Hall of Fame in 1999, the first artistic leader outside of New York to receive that honor. In 2002, Zelda delivered The Americans for the Arts 15th Annual Nancy Hanks Lecture on Arts and Public Policy at the Kennedy Center. In 2009, she received the Foremother Award from the National Center for Health Research.

Fichandler died in her home on July 29, 2016, in Washington, D.C., due to complications from congestive heart failure. She was 91 years old.

== Quote ==
"There is a hunger to see the human presence acted out. As long as that need remains, people will find a way to do theater."

== External links/sources ==
- Zelda Fichander profile, NYU Tisch School of the Arts website; accessed June 16, 2014.
- "Zelda Fichandler Wins Drama Award". The New York Times. December 1, 1985.
- Profile, washingtonpost.com; accessed July 26, 2015.
- Zelda Fichandler Papers
