= Lunar penetrometer =

The lunar penetrometer was a spherical electronic tool that served to measure the load-bearing characteristics of the Moon in preparation for spacecraft landings. It was designed by NASA to be dropped onto the surface from a vehicle orbiting overhead and transmit information to the spacecraft. However, despite it being proposed for several lunar and planetary missions, the device was never actually fielded by NASA.

== History ==
The lunar penetrometer was first developed in the early 1960s as part of NASA Langley Research Center's Lunar Penetrometer Program. At the time, immense pressures from the ongoing Space Race caused NASA to shift its focus from conducting purely scientific lunar expeditions to landing a man on the Moon before the Russians. As a result, the Jet Propulsion Laboratory's lunar flight projects, Ranger and Surveyor, were reconfigured to provide direct support to Project Apollo.

One of the major problems that NASA faced in preparation for the Apollo Moon landing was the inability to determine the surface characteristics of the Moon with regard to spacecraft landings and post-landing locomotion of exploratory vehicles and personnel. While radio and optical technology situated on Earth at the time could make out large-scale characteristics such as the size and distribution of mountains and craters, there wasn't an Earth-based method of measuring small-scale features, such as the lunar surface texture and topographical details, with adequate resolution. In 1961, NASA's chief engineer Abe Silverstein proposed to the U.S. Congress that Project Ranger would help provide important data on the Moon's surface topography to facilitate the Apollo lunar landing. Once funding was provided to the Ranger program, Silverstein directed NASA laboratories to investigate potential instruments that could return information on the hardness of the lunar surface.

Introduced shortly after Silverstein's directive, the Lunar Penetrometer Program devised the development of an impact-measuring instrumented projectile, or penetrometer, that provided preliminary information about the Moon's surface. The lunar penetrometer housed an impact accelerometer that measured the deceleration time history of the projectile as it made contact with the lunar surface to measure its hardness, bearing strength, and penetrability as well as a radio telemeter that could transmit the impact information to a remote receiver. Knowledge of the complete impact acceleration time history would have also made it possible for NASA researchers to ascertain the physical composition of the soil and whether it was granular, powdery, or brittle. If successful, the lunar penetrometer was planned for deployment for uncrewed landings in the Ranger and Surveyor programs as well as for the Apollo mission.

However, the Jet Propulsion Laboratory Space Sciences Division Manager Robert Meghreblian decided in August 1963 that the use of the lunar penetrometer to provide information on the lunar surface in situ was too risky. Instead, it was decided that the lunar surface composition would be determined by using gamma-ray spectrometry and surface topography via television photography and radar probing. In 1966, the lunar penetrometer was investigated as a potential sounding device for the Apollo missions, but no information exists on whether it was used in that manner.

== Design ==
In order to function properly, the lunar penetrometer was designed to sense the accelerations encountered by the projectile body during the impact process and telemeter the collected information to a nearby receiving station. Doing so required the penetrometer to package an acceleration sensing device as well as an independent telemetry system with a power supply, transmitter, and antenna system. The components also needed to be housed within a casing that could withstand a wide range of impact loads.

The lunar penetrometer came in the form of a spherical omnidirectional penetrometer that did not have to account for the orientation of the penetrometer during impact, which was difficult to factor in an environment with little to no atmosphere like the lunar surface. The omnidirectional design packaged the accelerometer, computer, power supply, and the telemetry system within a 3-inch diameter sphere. The lunar penetrometer's spherical instrumentation compartment had an omnidirectional acceleration sensor located at the center surrounded by concentrically placed batteries and electronic modules. The components were enclosed within an electromagnetic shield that provided a uniform metallic reference for the omnidirectional antenna encircling the instrumentation compartment. Outside the compartment, an impact limiter made out of balsa wood provided shock absorption to limit the impact forces on the internal components to tolerable levels and provided a low overall penetrometer density to assure sensitivity to soft, weak target surfaces. The balsa impact limiter was coated in a thin outer shell made out of fiber-glass epoxy.

=== Accelerometer ===
As part of the Lunar Penetrometer Program, the NASA Langley Research Center tasked the Harry Diamond Laboratories (later consolidated to form the U.S. Army Research Laboratory) with the development of the omnidirectional accelerometer for the lunar penetrometer. The omnidirectional accelerometer, or the omnidirectional acceleration sensor, was an accelerometer capable of measuring the acceleration time histories independent of its angular acceleration or orientation at impact. The researchers at Harry Diamond Laboratories originally employed a hollow piezoelectric sphere but later transitioned to modifying a conventional triaxial accelerometer. The instantaneous magnitude of the acceleration was computed by obtaining the square root of the sum of the squares of the three orthogonal, acceleration-time signatures. The omnidirectional accelerometer withstood a maximum of 40,000 G during shock testing and operated using a 20V power supply drawing 10 mA.

=== Telemetry system ===
The telemetry system for the lunar penetrometer was commissioned by NASA to the Canadian defence contractor Computing Devices of Canada (now known as General Dynamics Mission Systems). It consisted of a network that fed the output of the accelerometer to a radio frequency power amplifier that was also connected to a master oscillator and a buffer amplifier. The amplifiers and the oscillator functioned together to act as a transmitter, whose outputs were fed to a spherical antenna that was embedded in the outer skin of the penetrometer.

=== Relay craft ===
Due to limitations in available power, antenna efficiency, and other factors, the impact acceleration information from the lunar penetrometers could not be transmitted for extensive distances. As a result, a relay craft needed to be placed within the transmission field of the lunar penetrometers to intercept the lunar penetrometer signals and transmit them to a distant receiving station. When located within moderate range of a receiving station like a parent spacecraft, the relay craft served to simply amplify and redirect the lunar penetrometer signals. At greater distances, the relay craft would perform data signal processing where it exchanged the peak power requirement of instantaneous data transmission for longer transmission time to decrease the demands placed upon the power supply. The relay craft functioned so that it would receive the lunar penetrometer signals and transmit them to the receiving station only after the lunar penetrometers landed on the surface and before the relay craft itself crashed onto the ground. As a result, a strict time limit would be imposed on the relay craft to deliver the necessary data sent by the penetrometers.

== Operation ==
During lunar reconnaissance, a payload containing the lunar penetrometer and the relay station structure would be mounted on the spacecraft as it traveled to its destination. Above the lunar surface, the spacecraft would release the payload, which would spin for axis attitude stability and use the main retrorocket motor to reduce the descent velocity. At approximately 5,600 feet above the target area, the second retrorocket would fire once the main retrorocket was jettisoned from the payload. The centrifugal force resulting from the spin stabilization technique would cause a salvo of lunar penetrometers to disperse and free fall toward the lunar surface. The payload carriage would hold 16 lunar penetrometers in total that would be released in salvos of four at about 2 second intervals. The impact of the lunar penetrometers would be categorized as elastic, plastic, or penetration depending on the target surface. After the secondary retrorocket burns out, the payload would free fall to the lunar surface as well. Once the penetrometers make contact with the lunar surface, the impact information would then be transmitted to the descending payload relay station, which would then be relayed to a transmitting antenna system on Earth. In short, this chain of communication would take place within the time interval between the release of the lunar penetrometers and the moment the payload relay station lands on the lunar surface.

== Testing ==
=== Shock testing ===
Harry Diamond Laboratories was tasked with developing a high-energy shock testing method that monitored the omnidirectional accelerometer's behavior during acceleration peaking at 20,000 G. Components of the omnidirectional accelerometer, such as the resistors, capacitors, oscillators, and magnetic cores, were subjected to a modified air gun test. The component being tested was placed within a target body inside an extension tube in front of an air gun. The air gun would fire a projectile, impacting the target body and accelerating it to a peak of 20,000 G until it hit the lead target only a short distance away inside the extension tube. The results of the shock test showed that the resistors and capacitors changed very little during shock, while the commercial subcarrier oscillator and the tape-wound magnetic cores were affected considerably.

=== Impact testing ===
More than 200 impact tests were conducted with the spherical lunar penetrometer in investigating its soil penetration characteristics. Most consisted of impacting the penetrometers to a wide range of target materials at velocities ranging from 6 to 76 m/s and then recording the measured impact characteristics. Several experiments investigated the penetrometer's ability to predict the depth to which a lunar module would penetrate the surface of the landing zone. The results of these studies found that the lunar penetrometers were successful in not only identifying the nature of the impacted surface, i.e. whether the surface was rigid or collapsible, but also in distinguishing between particulate materials of different bearing strength from peak impact accelerations. The lunar penetrometers were able to accurately predict the conditions of the landing pad penetrations.

=== Sounding device application ===
The lunar penetrometer was studied as a potential sounding device for a crewed Apollo lunar module landing in 1966. The device was suggested to assist astronauts in on-the-spot decision making regarding whether a safe landing of the lunar module could be made. Once dropped individually or in salvo within the landing zone, the lunar penetrometers could autonomously transmit an acceleration-time profile upon impact and characterize the surface hardness of the landing zone. A short study on the feasibility of this application was conducted to determine the flight, trajectory, and impact parameters of the lunar penetrometers once launched from a lunar module. The study found that the lunar penetrometer's impact velocities were limited to range from 120 ft/s to 200 ft/s, meaning that the velocities impact angles would have to vary between 54 and 62 percent from the vertical. The earliest that a lunar penetrometer had to be launched was at a range of 3,400 feet and an altitude of 1,075 feet, which would grant the crew in the lunar module 16 seconds to analyze the penetrometer data.
