= Harry Diamond (engineer) =

American radio inventor (1900–1948)

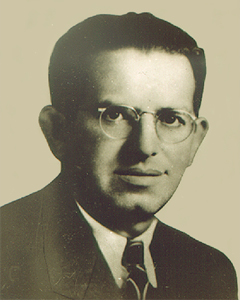
- Harry Diamond, c.1940
- Born: February 12, 1900; Russia
- Died: June 21, 1948 (aged 48)
- Resting place: Arlington National Cemetery
- Education: Massachusetts Institute of Technology (1922)
- Occupation: Engineer
- Spouse: Ida Diamond
- Children: 2, including Zelda Fichandler

Harry Diamond (12 February 1900 – 21 June 1948) was an American radio pioneer and inventor, and namesake for Diamond Ordnance Fuze Laboratories, which later became part of the Army Research Laboratory.

== Early life ==
Diamond, the son of a Jewish tailor in Minsk, was born on February 12, 1900. In 1908 his family immigrated to the United States, and he grew up in Quincy, Massachusetts. Diamond enlisted in the United States Army on October 14, 1918, and was honorably discharged on December 9, 1918. He graduated with a degree in Electrical Engineering from Massachusetts Institute of Technology in 1922. Diamond worked for the General Electric company for 18 months. He completed his master's degree in Electrical Engineering in 1925 and worked as an Electrical Engineering instructor for 4 years at Lehigh University.

== Bureau of Standards ==
He joined the National Bureau of Standards in 1927. Diamond headed up the research and development work of the Commerce Department's newly organized Bureau of Air Commerce. Within two years he developed radio beacon system that permitted the first "blind" aircraft landing. Diamond and his team made the first visual-type radiobeacon system that enabled a pilot to keep on course and to know his approximate position at all times while in flight. Direction service could be given to any number of planes flying the course, and each airplane only had to carry a receiving set, with no other special equipment whatsoever. The pilot would obtain the necessary information pertaining to amplitude of course deviations hands-free and without requiring earphones. This was accomplished by the development of vibrating-reed indicators alerting the pilot to an off-course condition.

== Proximity Fuze development ==
Harry Diamond became the Chief of the Electronics Division. The National Bureau of Standards was brought into the program, and he was given responsibility for this phase of the Bureau's work. Within about four months of the start of the program, Diamond's group established feasibility of the radio proximity fuze through conclusive tests in bombs dropped at the Naval Proving Ground at Dahlgren, Va. Throughout World War II, this group acted as the central laboratory of Division 4 of the National Defense Research Committee, where Diamond was the central figure of the group. Much of the basic proximity fuze technology was developed under his direction.

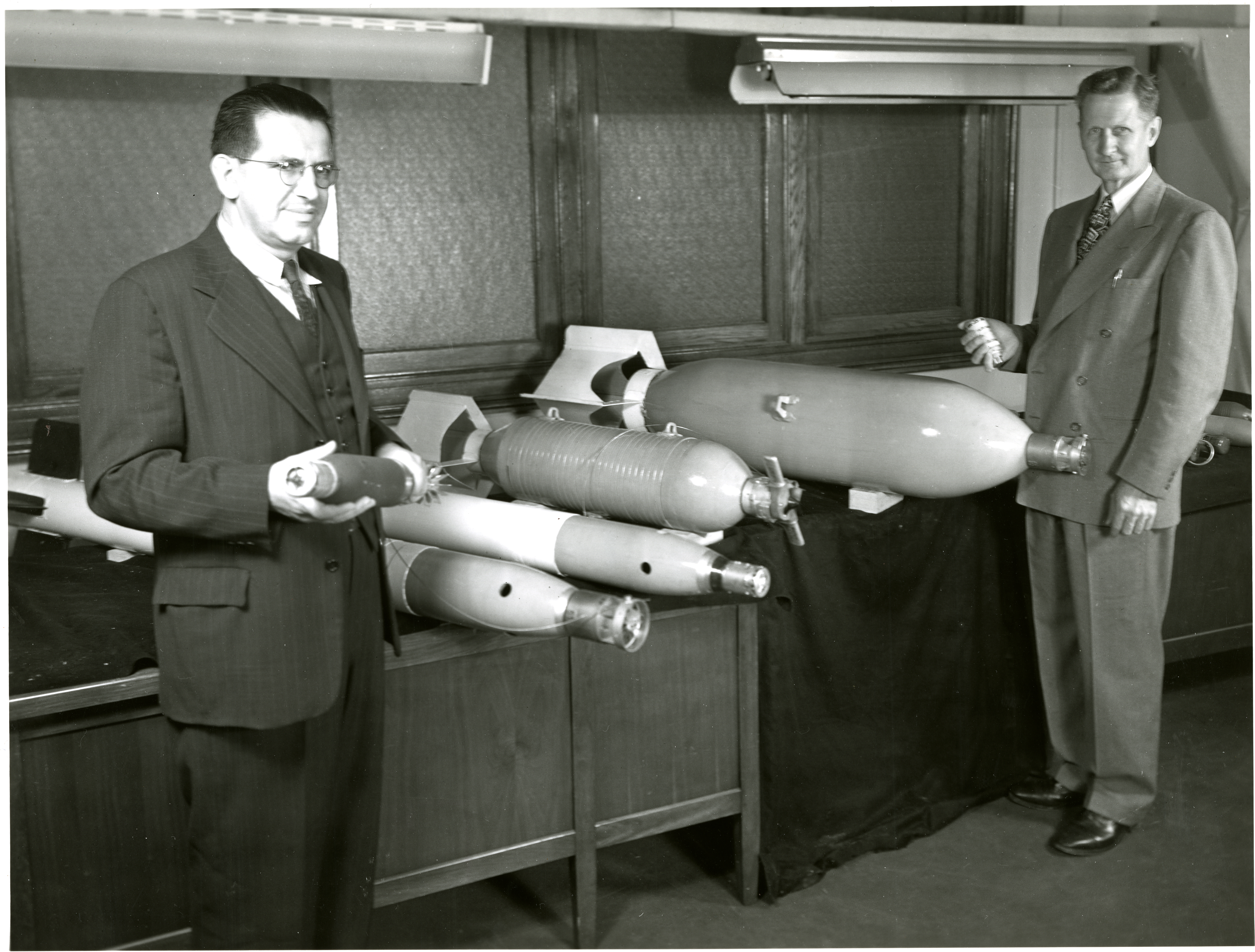
Harry Diamond with examples of his proximity fuze

Later, as Chief of the Ordnance Development Division, he was assigned the task of supervising the development of proximity fuzes for nonrotating projectiles such as bombs, rockets, and mortars. It was calculated that a fuze which would explode a projectile near a plane or at some height above a target on the surface would increase lethality.

Diamond, through his vast knowledge in the field of electronics, contributed greatly to the fundamental concept and design of proximity fuzes. He held 16 patents for electronics-related inventions. The Ordnance Development Division, upon transfer from the National Bureau of Standards to the Army in 1953, was named the Diamond Ordnance Fuze Laboratories in honor of Mr. Diamond. It was later renamed the Harry Diamond Laboratories. The War Department later described inventor Harry Diamond's proximity fuze as "one of the outstanding scientific developments of World War II ... second only to the atomic bomb" in military importance.

== Personal life ==
Diamond's daughter Zelda Fichandler along with her husband Thomas C. Fichandler in 1950 co-founded the Arena Stage in Washington DC.

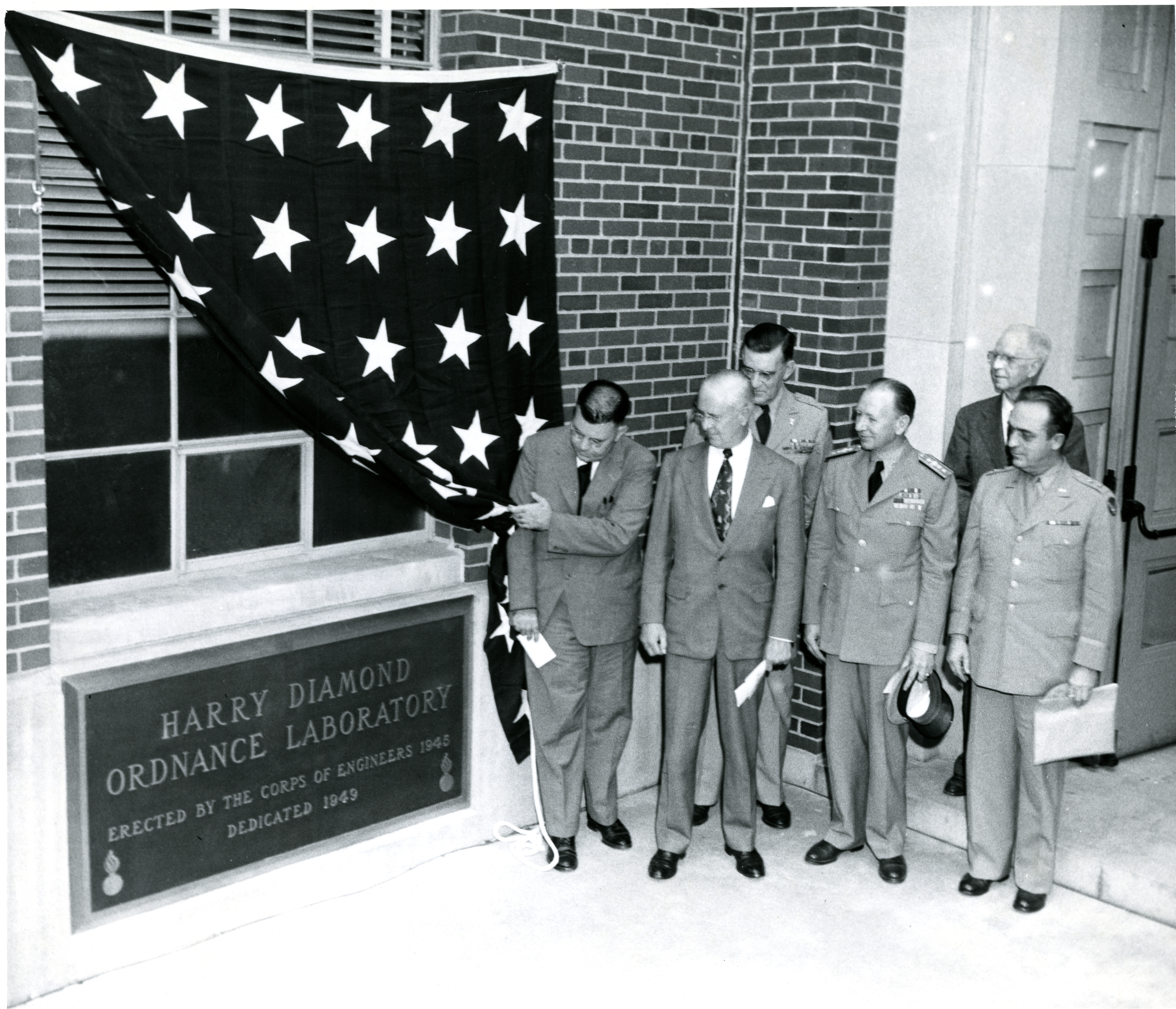
Harry Diamond Lab dedication

Diamond died on June 21, 1948, and was buried at Arlington National Cemetery on June 22.
