= Aurora Pulsed Radiation Simulator =

The Aurora Pulsed Radiation Simulator (also known as the Aurora flash x-ray simulator) was a 14-terawatt flash gamma-ray simulator, designed to simulate the effects of a nuclear weapon's bremsstrahlung, or gamma radiation, pulses on military electronic systems. It was built in 1971 by the U.S. Defense Atomic Support Agency, which eventually became the Defense Threat Reduction Agency, and the U.S. Department of Energy.

The Aurora Simulator was more than 161 feet (49 m) long and weighed 1,450 tons; it was the first gamma radiation simulator of its size in the world at the time. It was also one of only four large machines in the United States built specifically to test complete nuclear weapons packages, with the other three being the Hermes I to III simulators at Sandia Base, New Mexico. Situated at the Harry Diamond Laboratories (which later became a part of the Army Research Laboratory) in Adelphi, Maryland, it was used to test complete weapons electronics packages from the warheads of intercontinental ballistic missiles (ICBMs) to satellites. After more than 20 years of use during the Cold War, the Aurora Simulator was officially decommissioned and disassembled in 1996.

In 1986, the Aurora facility set the world record for the largest amount of high-power microwave power generated from a virtual cathode oscillator. As a result, HDL was recognized by the American Defense Preparedness Association (ADPA) in 1987.

== History ==
Following the use of the atomic bomb in World War II and subsequent development, it became clear that much of the damage they produce comes from powerful, short (sub-microsecond) pulses of various kinds of radiation. Exactly how this works depends, among other particulars, on where the bomb explodes: if it's inside some material, underground and even in air, a primary effect is a shock wave from the expanding bomb material (which, itself, remains more or less in place). However, x-rays with energies between about 1 and 10 MeV, which are least absorbed by materials, can radiate far outside the immediate region of the explosion even as they are gradually absorbed by the material they pass through. In air, they go just about 1000 times farther than they would in water. Since all the x-rays go at the light speed, their pulse shape reflects the explosion itself: much shorter than a microsecond. Sub-MeV radiation from a nuclear explosion may be more important in (empty) space. Given this realization, during the 1960s the U.S. military began to investigate whether military systems could be tested for their response to nuclear-weapon generated pulsed x-rays with flash x-ray machines. At the time these were fairly small, primarily used to take x-rays of fast-moving events such as explosives and bullets.

After the Soviet Union demonstrated the use of the world's first anti-ballistic missiles (ABMs) in 1964, in response DASA launched a series of projects that aimed to hasten the advancement of nuclear effects laboratories in the United States. The U.S. military was concerned that the introduction and subsequent nuclear explosion of Soviet AMBs into the airspace would result in radiation that could interfere with the electronics systems of inbound U.S. ICBMs. In order to thoroughly harden U.S. missiles, in 1969 DASA initiated the construction of the Aurora Simulator as a gamma radiation test facility that could produce full-threat level pulses of 1 to 10 MeV photons ("gamma" radiation refers to x-rays (or photons) emitted by nuclei and typically more energetic than 1 MeV).

When selecting the site for the Aurora facility, DASA wanted the gamma radiation simulator to be situated at an existing military laboratory. After much deliberation between the Air Force Weapons Laboratory (AFWL) in New Mexico and the Army and Navy laboratories in the Washington, D.C. area, DASA chose the latter and granted the Harry Diamond Laboratory (HDL) the responsibility of operating the facility. In order to house the Aurora Simulator, HDL moved from its downtown Washington, D.C. site to an area of land in White Oak, Maryland, which would eventually become the ARL Adelphi site.

The cooperation between DASA and HDL on the Aurora project led to many HDL researchers becoming involved in the simulator's development, including assistant to DASA Deputy Director for Science and Technology Peter Haas and former participant in the Manhattan Project Paul Caldwell, who later was placed in charge of the Aurora Simulator. In turn, Caldwell hired physicist Alexander Stewart from Ion Physics (IP) and HDL's Robert Lamb and Dennis Whittaker, the four of whom (including Caldwell) made up the bulk of the research and development team for the Aurora project. The construction of the Aurora Simulator was completed in January 1971, costing about $16 million, and the first test was conducted on the Spartan ABM flight control set in April 1972. Throughout its entire run at HDL, which ended in 1995, the Aurora Simulator conducted 287 numbered tests, resulting in more than 9,100 test shots.

== Operation ==
The Aurora Pulsed Radiation Simulator consisted of four 14 MV Marx generators, each of which contained four parallel 1.25 MJ units connected together to drive four parallel oil-dielectric Blumlein pulse-forming lines (PFLs). Each PFL was coupled with an E-beam diode.

The Aurora Simulator produced four short pulses of high energy bremsstrahlung radiation that overlapped to deliver a single 120 ns wide pulse of 20 to 50 krads (Si) into a 1m cube. It could also deliver 25 krads (Si) throughout a 1m diameter and 1m long cylindrical volume or 50 krads (Si) throughout a 25 cm sphere. What made the Aurora Simulator unique was its ability to provide such a high dose uniformly throughout the nominally cubic-meter volume, which sometimes needed dose measurements at up to 200 locations within a single electronics system. However, in order to obtain the desired radiation levels, all four 230-kA bremsstrahlung pulses had to overlay within 10 ns. This synchronization was made possible by the symmetrization of the four Blumleins that was achieved only just before the facility was closed. During active testing, the Aurora Simulator could do as many as 13 test shots in a single day. In comparison, nuclear weapons testing at the Nevada Test Site was limited to one test shot per three months.

There were two main limitations to the operation of the Aurora Simulator. Early on, the long discharge time of the Blumeins sometimes allowed unintended arcs through the oil to shorten or even prevent the bremsstrahlung pulses. In the early 1990s this problem was solved by improvements in triggering the Blumlein's V/N oil switch. Second, the 40-Ohm impedance of the Blumleins made it inefficient to drive low impedance loads.
