= Radar Research and Development Establishment =

Civilian research organization in the UK

Coordinates: 52.13414°N 2.33509°W

The Radar Research and Development Establishment, RRDE for short, was a civilian research organization run by the United Kingdom's Ministry of Supply that primarily studied the development of radar for British Army use.

The group traces its history to the Searchlight Experimental Establishment which moved to RAF Biggin Hill in 1924, and the "Army Cell" operating at Bawdsey Manor researching radar beside their Air Ministry counterparts. In 1941 the Army groups merged and moved to Christchurch, Dorset and were renamed the Air Defence Research and Development Establishment.

In May 1942 the group moved again, this time to an inland location at Malvern, Worcestershire, and were once again renamed to become the RRDE. Their Air Ministry counterparts, who had also moved to the Dorset area and been renamed the Telecommunications Research Establishment (TRE), joined them in Malvern over the next few months.

The RRDE retained their name until 1953 when they merged with the TRE to form the unified Radar Research Establishment. The RRE was renamed in 1957 by Elizabeth II to become the Royal Radar Establishment.
