= Petoscope =

A Petoscope is an optoelectronic device for detecting small, distant objects such as flying aircraft. The design, as described in 1936, consisted of an instrument with two parallel light paths. In each path was a collimating objective lens, a screen marked with many small, alternating opaque and transparent squares in a chequerboard pattern, and a second concentrating lens focused on a photocell. The two screens were inverted with respect to each other. This caused a small object in the instrument's field of view to produce differing signals in the two photocells, while a large object affected both light paths equally. The difference between the two signals was amplified and used to raise an alarm. At the beginning of World War II, the device was adapted for use in proximity fuses for bombs.

The inventor was Alan S. Fitzgerald of Wynnewood, Pennsylvania, U.S.A., a Research Associate in Electrical Engineering at Swarthmore College.
