= Air Defence Research and Development Establishment =

Civilian research organization that studied the development of radar for British Army

The Air Defence Research and Development Establishment (ADRDE) was a British civilian research organization run by the War Office that primarily studied the development of radar for British Army use. It was formed in 1941 from the merger of the Air Defence Experimental Establishment in Christchurch, Dorset and the "Army Cell" that had previously worked on radar design within the Air Ministry's Telecommunications Research Establishment at Bawdsey Manor.

The ADRDE existed under this name for only a short time; in May 1942 it moved to Malvern and was renamed the Radar Research and Development Establishment (RRDE). In March 1943, the Signals Research and Development Establishment (SRDE) took over the former ADRDE buildings in Christchurch. Years later, in 1976, the SRDE joined the RRDE in Malvern.

While still known as ADRDE, the group was responsible for the ad hoc development of the SLC radar, as well as GL Mk. II radar and the start of the GL Mk. III radar efforts.
