= Searchlight Experimental Establishment =

The Searchlight Experimental Establishment, or SLEE, was a Royal Engineers research group who studied the improvement of searchlights and other anti-aircraft systems like sound locators and predictors.

The SLEE initially formed up at Woolwich Common in 1917 during World War I as a small group within the Corps of London Electrical Engineers to research anti-aircraft artillery and searchlights. In 1919, they took over sound locator development and began the acoustic mirror program that stretched into the 1930s before it was replaced by radar.

In 1924 the group moved to RAF Biggin Hill and was renamed the Air Defence Experimental Establishment, or ADEE.

In April 1941, the SEE conducted a top-secret experiment at Newark. They took 54 members of the Auxiliary Territorial Service (ATS) to see if women could handle the grueling technical demands of searchlight batteries.
