= Air Defence Experimental Establishment =

The Air Defence Experimental Establishment (ADEE) was a civil agency run by the British War Office, the civilian side of the British Army. It was primarily tasked with developing sound ranging of enemy artillery, and the development of anti-aircraft weapons and techniques, notably searchlights.

It was originally formed as the Searchlight Experimental Establishment (SLEE) at Woolwich in 1917 out of a group within the Experimental Section of the Royal Engineers. In 1923 it moved to RAF Biggin Hill and in 1924 was renamed the Air Defence Experimental Establishment. In 1939 it moved to Christchurch, Dorset.

In 1941 it was joined by another development group known simply as the "Army Cell" that had been working on radar systems at Bawdsey Manor. The two groups were merged to become the Air Defence Research and Development Establishment (ADRDE). The radar groups from the Air Ministry, by this time known as the Telecommunications Research Establishment (TRE), moved to nearby Swanage that same year.
