= Astin =

Astin is a surname. Notable people with the surname include:

- Alexander Astin (1932–2022), American education professor
- Allen V. Astin (1904–1984), American physicist and director of the National Institute of Standards and Technology
- Anne Astin, Australian biochemist and forensic expert
- Barrett Astin (born 1991), American pitcher
- Helen Astin (1932–2015), Greek-born American education professor
- James Astin (1900–1979), English footballer
- John Astin (born 1930), American actor and teacher
- Mackenzie Astin (born 1973), American actor, son of John Astin and Patty Duke
- Patty Duke Astin, now known as Patty Duke (1946–2016), US actor, singer, author, and mental health advocate; ex-wife of John Astin
- Sean Astin (born 1971), American actor, director, producer, and voice artist; son of Patty Duke; adopted son of John Astin
- Skylar Astin (born 1987), American actor and musician

== Fictional characters ==
- Jan Rek ter'Astin, a character in the fictional Liaden universe
- Dr. Robert Astin, a character in the television series Quincy, M.E.

== Other uses ==
- Astin, Koine Greek name for Vashti, first wife of King Ahasuerus in the Book of Esther
- ASTIN, acronym for Actuarial Studies in Non-life Insurance, a section of the International Actuarial Association

== See also ==
- Asten (disambiguation)
- Aston (disambiguation)
- Austin (disambiguation)
