= Elham (given name) =

Elham (Arabic: الهام :Persian;إلهام) is a unisex name derived from the Arabic name Ilham which means "inspiration". Different spellings include İlham or İlhami in Turkic languages. Ellie is sometimes used as a shortened term/form of Elham. The name Elham may refer to:

- Elham Al Qasim (born 1982), Emirati explorer
- Elham Aminzadeh (born 1964), Iranian politician
- Elham Asghari (born 1981), Iranian swimmer
- Elham Hamidi (born 1977), Iranian actress
- Elham Kazemi (born 1970), Iranian–American mathematics educator
- Elham Manea (born 1966), Yemeni writer
- Elham Mahamid Ruzin (born 1990), Israeli Paralympic goalball player
- Elham Salehi (born 1980), Iranian para-athlete
- Elham Shaheen (born 1961), Egyptian actress
- Elham Tabassi, engineer and government leader
- Elham Yaghoubian (born 1972), Iranian writer
- Elham Youssefian, Iranian human rights lawyer

== See also ==
- Ilham
