= Winnie Wong-Ng =

Chinese-American chemist

- 黃桂華
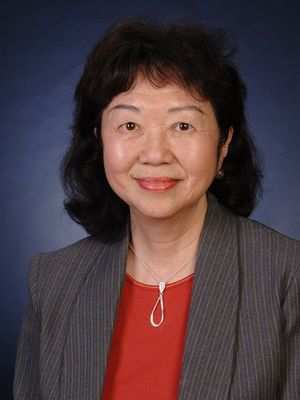
- Education: Chinese University of Hong Kong (BSc); Louisiana State University (PhD)
- Awards: Department of Commerce Bronze Medal (2002 and 2008)
- Scientific career
- Fields: Chemistry, crystallography
- Workplaces: University of Toronto; International Centre for Diffraction Data; University of Maryland, College Park; National Institute of Standards and Technology

Winnie Kwai-Wah Wong-Ng (Chinese: 黃桂華) is a Chinese-American physical chemist. She is a research chemist at the ceramics division at the National Institute of Standards and Technology. Her research includes energy applications, crystallography, thermoelectric standards, metrology, and data, sorbent materials for sustainability, and high throughput combinatorial approach for novel materials discovery and property optimization for energy conversion applications. She is a fellow of the International Centre for Diffraction Data, American Ceramic Society, American Crystallographic Association, and the American Association for the Advancement of Science. Wong-Ng was twice awarded the Department of Commerce Bronze Medal.

== Education ==
Wong-Ng completed a B.Sc. in chemistry and physics at Chinese University of Hong Kong in 1969. She earned a Ph.D. in inorganic and physical chemistry at Louisiana State University in 1974.

== Career and research ==
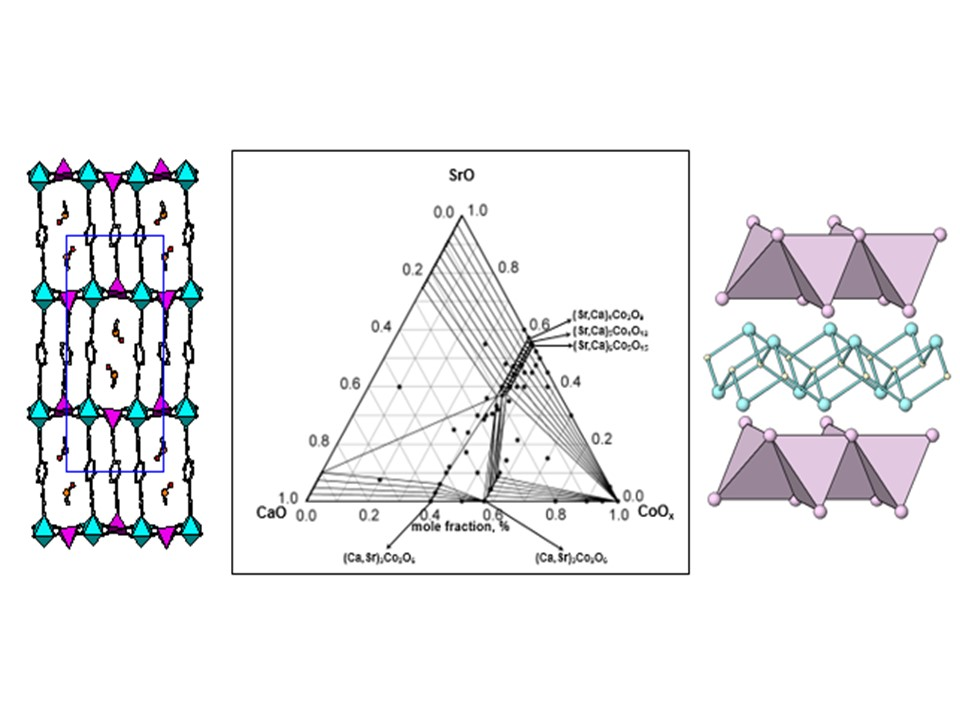
Wong-Ng's research- Figure 1(left): Synchrotron X-ray crystal structure of a flexible pillared Ni(CN)4-based Hoffman-Type Metal Organic Framework (MOF) for CO2 capture application; Figure 2(center): Phase diagram of the Ca-Sr-Co-O system showing the thermoelectric phase (Ca,Sr)3Co4O9; Figure 3 (right): Crystal Structure of a layered (Bi,Pb)CuSeO thermoelectric material.

Wong-Ng was a research associate and lecturer in the chemistry department at the University of Toronto. From 1981 to 1985, she was a critical review scientist at the International Centre for Diffraction Data. Wong-Ng was a research scientist in the chemistry department at University of Maryland, College Park and a research associate in the ceramics division at the National Bureau of Standards from 1985 to 1988. Since 1988, Wong-Ng works as a research chemist in the ceramics division at the National Institute of Standards and Technology. She served as president the Association of NIST Asian Pacific Americans from 2000 to 2003.

Wong-Ng's research interest includes materials for energy applications, thermoelectric standards, metrology, and data, sorbent materials for sustainability, and high throughput combinatorial approach for novel materials discovery and property optimization for energy conversion applications. She also researches crystallography, phase equilibria, and crystal chemistry of energy materials to understand their structure and property relationships. Structural studies involve synchrotron X-ray and neutron diffraction techniques.

== Awards and honors ==
In 2000, Wong-Ng became a fellow of the International Centre for Diffraction Data (ICDD). She was awarded fellow of the American Ceramic Society in 2002. In 2002 and 2008, she won the Department of Commerce Bronze Medal. In 2014, Wong-Ng was made fellow of the American Crystallographic Association. In 2012, she became a distinguished fellow of the ICDD and a Fellow of the American Association for the Advancement of Science. She became an academician of the World Academy of Ceramics in 2018.
