= Material ConneXion =

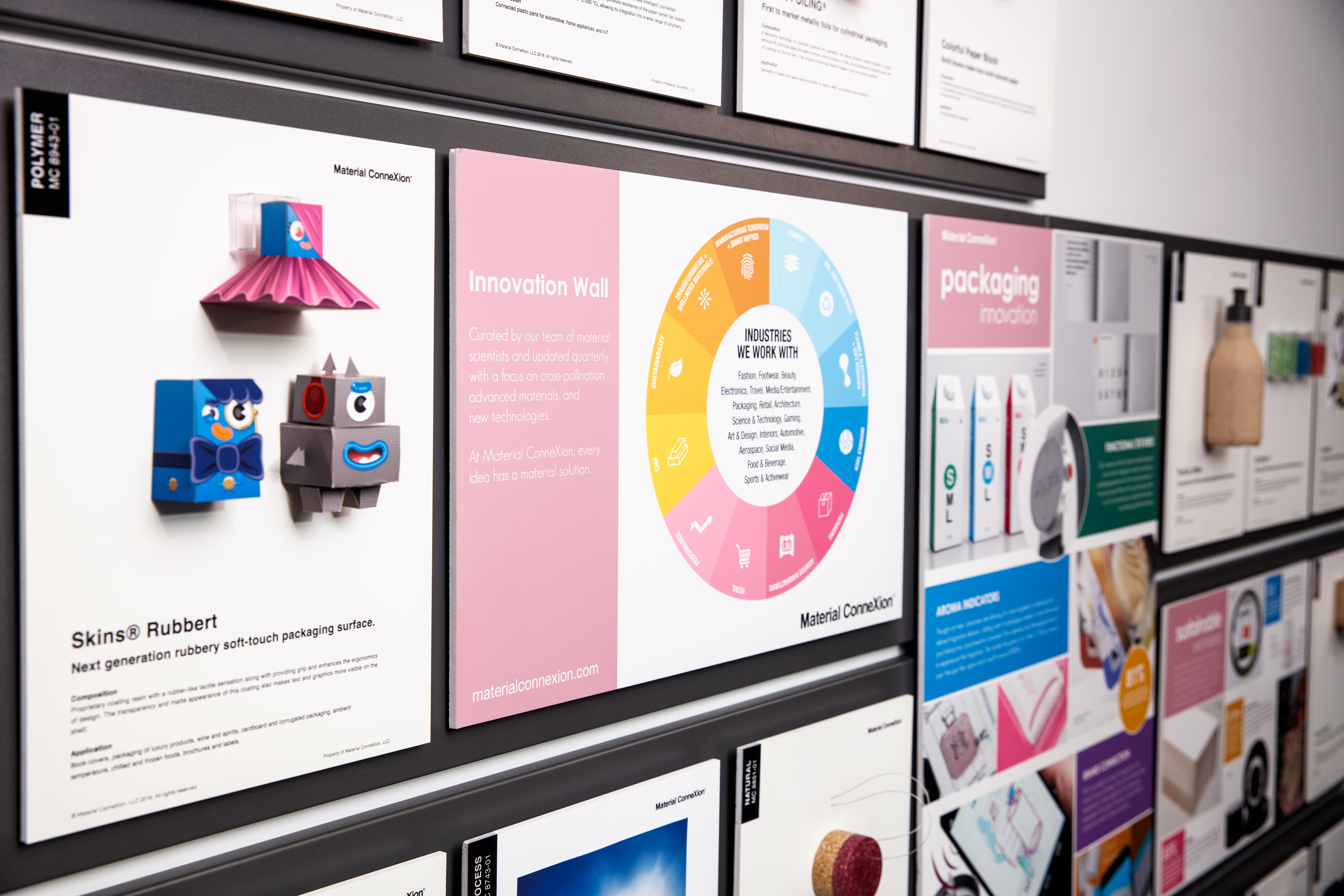
A close-up view of a packaging materials display featured in the MCX offices in NYC (2018)

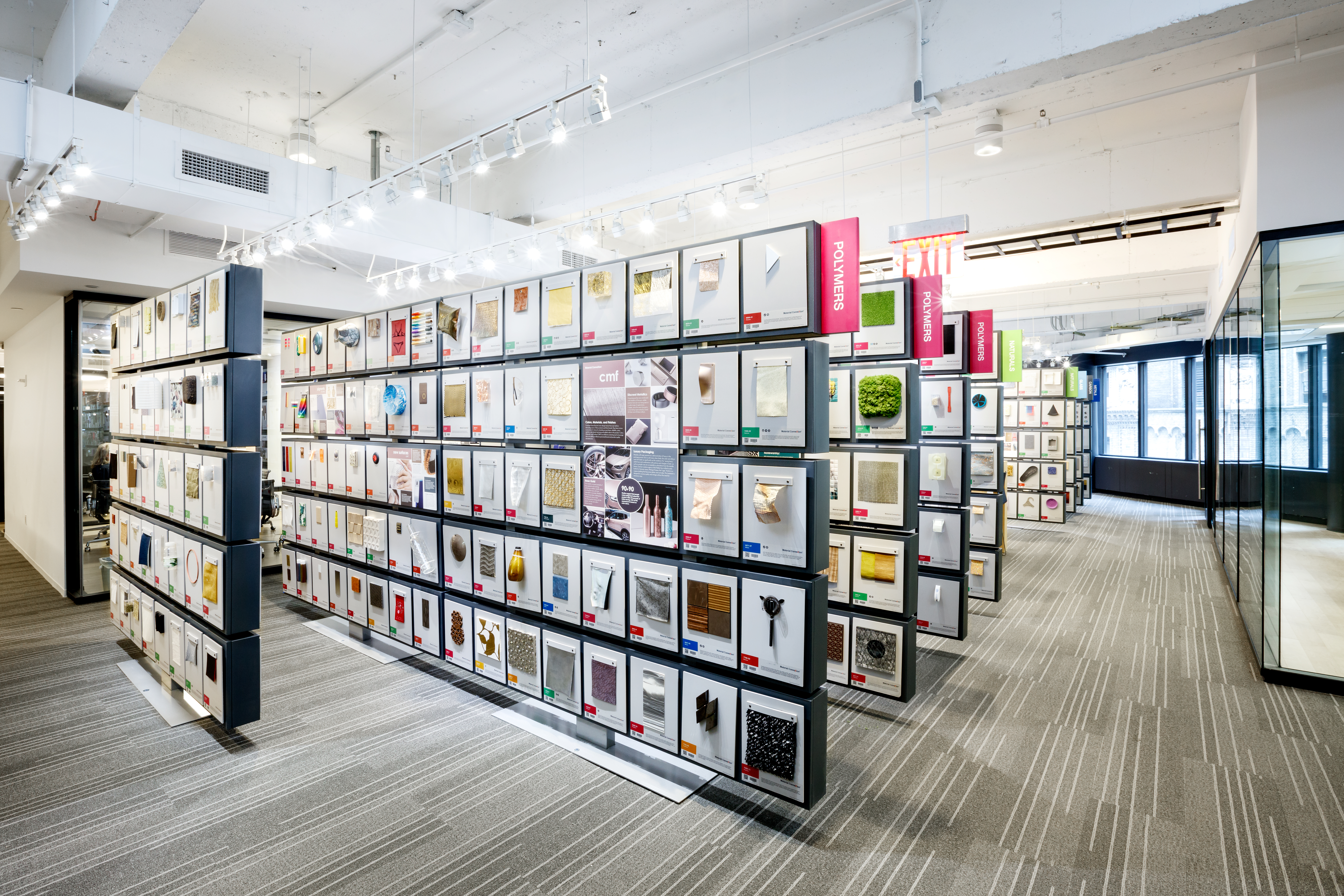
A view of the MCX Material Library in NYC (2018)

Material ConneXion is a materials consultancy, headquartered in New York City, New York.

== History ==
In 1997, Material ConneXion was launched by George Beylerian, former vice president of marketing and creative director of Steelcase Furniture. At Steelcase, Beylerian created a small exhibition of new materials, and recognized the need for a materials library service.

Material ConneXion was acquired by SANDOW in 2011.

In addition to its New York office, the company has locations in Bangkok, Daegu, Milan, and Skövde, and also maintains an online materials database.

Material ConneXion maintains a physical library of over 10,000 materials and processes categorized based on their chemical composition: Polymers, Naturals, Metals, Glass, Processes, Ceramics, Cement-based, Carbon-based.

In 2016, the American Society of Interior Designers (ASID) opened a Material ConneXion Library at its corporate headquarters in Washington, D.C., in partnership with the American Chemistry Council (ACC). The library features samples of innovative materials and products with an emphasis on health and wellness in the built environment.

== Notable Projects ==
Material ConneXion clients have included design and architecture firms, government agencies, and large corporations such as Adidas, Target Corporation, PUMA, and BMW.

In 2001, designer Sandy Chilewich discovered a woven vinyl material in Material ConneXion's library that led to her Chilewich brand of household products and accessories. The company also worked with designer Harry Allen to find a sustainable, low-cost, post-industrial polypropylene packaging material for Aveda’s Ukuru line of cosmetics. In 2004, Material ConneXion helped Nike source a monofilament sleeving normally used to protect PVC pipes from bursting for use in its Air Jordan XIX.

Through its partnership with McDonough Braungart Design Chemistry (MBDC) and the Environmental Protection and Encouragement Agency (EPEA), Material ConneXion is the only Materials Library in the world to feature Cradle to Cradle assessed and certified materials and the only materials consultancy to offer Cradle to Cradle Certification and Cradle to Cradle product development.

== Critical reception ==
In 2007, Material ConneXion was named a “Top Eco-Innovator” by The New York Times for its efforts to make information on sustainable materials and sustainable design practices more readily available to designers and corporations.
