= NCSL =

NCSL can refer to several things:

- National College for School Leadership – British government-funded Non-Departmental Public Body for head teachers and school leaders
- National Conference of State Legislatures – non-governmental organization for members and staff of US state legislatures
- New Caledonia Super Ligue, top division association football league of New Caledonia
- New Caledonia Second Level, second division association football league of New Caledonia
- NCSL International – non-profit organization concerned with metrology and related fields
- Nashville, Chattanooga and St. Louis Railway - American railway which operated from 1851-1957
