= Smart Grid Interoperability Panel =

Smart Grid Grid Interoperability Panel
- Founded: December 2009
- Type: Professional Organization
- Purpose: Smart Grid, Power Transmission and Distribution, Renewable Energy, Communications, Microgrids Electric Vehicles
- Origins: Established by the U.S. National Institute of Standards and Technology (NIST) as a public-private partnership
- Region served: Worldwide
- Method: Industry standards review, Conferences, Publications
- Key people: Sharon Allan (CEO), Nick Wagner (treasurer) and David Forfia (Chairman)
- Website: sgip.org

Smart Grid Interoperability Panel or SGIP is an organization that defines requirements for a smarter electric grid by driving interoperability, the use of standard, and collaborating across organizations to address gaps and issue hindering the deployment of smart grid technologies.

SGIP facilitates and runs different working groups to address key topical areas such as the architecture group, the grid management group, the cybersecurity group, the distributed resources and generation group, and the testing and certification group.

== History ==
SGIP 1.0 was established in December 2009 as a new stakeholder forum to provide technical support to the Commerce Department’s National Institute of Standards and Technology (NIST) with the assistance from Knoxville and EnerNex Corp, under a contract enabled by the American Recovery and Reinvestment Act.

SGIP 2.0 was established as a public-private organization which transitioned into a non-profit public-private partnership organization in 2013.

== Function ==
The prime functions of SGIP is reported to be-

- To specify testing and certification requirements that are necessary in order to improve interoperability Smart Grid-related equipment, software, and services.
- To provide technical guidance to facilitate the development of standards for a secure, interoperable Smart Grid.
- To supervise the performance of activities intended to expedite the development of interoperability and cybersecurity specifications by standard development organizations.
- To foster innovation and address gaps hindering the acceleration of grid modernization.
- To educate, facilitate the collaboration, and provide solutions to grid modernization.

SGIP 1.0’s initial focus was to define the industry standards for 20 categories, representing every domain in the power industry and these categories include:

1. Appliance and consumer electronic providers
2. Commercial and industrial equipment manufacturers and automation vendors
3. Consumers - residential, commercial and industrial
4. Electric transportation
5. Electric utility companies - investor owned utilities and federal and state power authorities
6. Electric utility companies - municipal and investor owned
7. Electric utility companies - rural electric association
8. Electricity and financial market traders
9. Independent power producers
10. Information and communication technologies infrastructure and service providers
11. Information technology application developers and integrators
12. Power equipment manufacturers and vendors
13. Professional societies, users groups, trade associations and industry consortia
14. Research and development organizations and academia
15. Relevant government entities
16. Renewable power producers
17. Retail service providers
18. Standards and specification development organizations
19. State and local regulators
20. Testing and certification vendors
21. Transmission operators and independent system operators
22. Venture capital

When SGIP 1.0 transitioned to SGIP 2.0, LLC, the focus remained for interoperability and addressing gaps in standards and also focused on Distributed Energy Resources, EnergyIoT, Cybersecurity and Orange Button.

== Overview ==
In 2013, SGIP was the recipient of PMI Distinguished Project Award.

In November 2014, Sharon Allan was appointed as the president and CEO of SGIP.

In October 2015, SGIP partnered with Industrial Internet Consortium in order to develop technologies and testbeds to accelerate IoT adoption in the energy sector.

In November 2015, SGIP was the recipient of the Smart Grid Interoperability Standards Cooperative Agreement Program federal funding opportunity from NIST, during which, SGIP was reported to receive $2.1 million during the performance period from January 1, 2016, to December 2018.

In March 2016, SGIP announced that the Open Field Message Bus (OpenFMB) was ratified as a standard through a NAESB Retail Market Quadrant member vote. OpenFMB is said to be SGIP’s EnergyIoT initiative, bringing the IoT and advanced interoperability to the power grid.

In April 2016, the organization received $615,426 from US Department of Energy, which was used for reducing non-hardware soft-costs associated with solar projects.

In February 2017, SGIP merged with Smart Electric Power Alliance(SEPA) under SEPA brand and organizational umbrella.

== See also ==
- Distributed Generation
- Energy Policy
- Intermittent Power Sources
- Renewables
- Smart Grid
- Smart Grids by Country
- Smart Meter
- Microgrid
- NIST
- FERC
