= Alexander Astin =

American educator (1932–2022)

- Born: May 30, 1932; Washington, D.C., U.S.
- Died: May 18, 2022 (aged 89); Los Angeles, California
- Other name: Sandy Astin
- Education: Gettysburg College (BA); University of Maryland, College Park (MA, PhD)
- Occupation: Professor
- Spouse: Helen Stavridou (m. 1956; died 2015)
- Children: 2
- Parent(s): Allen V. Astin; Margaret Mackenzie
- Relatives: John Astin (brother); Mackenzie Astin (nephew); Sean Astin (adoptive nephew)

Alexander W. Astin (May 30, 1932 – May 18, 2022) was the Allan M. Cartter Distinguished Professor of Higher Education and Organizational Change, at the University of California, Los Angeles.

He was founding director of the Higher Education Research Institute at UCLA. He has served as Director of Research for both the American Council on Education and the National Merit Scholarship Corporation. He was also the founding director of the Cooperative Institutional Research Program, an ongoing national study of some fifteen million students, 300,000 faculty and staff, and 1,800 higher education institutions.

== Career ==
Astin received his A.B. degree in Music from Gettysburg College in 1953 and his Master of Arts and Ph.D. in Psychology from the University of Maryland in 1958. Astin has been director of research for both the American Council on Education (1965–1973) and the National Merit Scholarship Corporation (1960–1965). He has authored 23 books and more than 300 other publications in the field of higher education, and has been a recipient of awards for outstanding research from more than a dozen national associations and professional societies. He has also been elected to membership in the National Academy of Education (NAEd), a fellow at the Center for Advanced Study in the Behavioral Sciences at Stanford University, and a recipient of eleven honorary degrees. A 1990 study in the Journal of Higher Education identified Astin as the most frequently-cited author in the field of higher education. A 2010 study in the same journal also identified him as the author most cited by others in the field of higher education. In 1985 readers of Change magazine selected Astin as the person "most admired for creative, insightful thinking" in the field of higher education. His latest book is Are You Smart Enough? How Colleges' Obsession with Smartness Shortchanges Students (Stylus, 2016).

== Personal life and hobbies ==
Astin was born in Washington, D.C. to the late Margaret Linnie Mackenzie and Allen V. Astin, a physicist and the fifth director of the National Bureau of Standards now the National Institute of Standards & Technology. His elder brother is actor John Astin (Visiting Professor and Director, Theatre Arts and Studies at Johns Hopkins University and Gomez on The Addams Family).

Astin married Helen Stavridou on February 11, 1956. They were colleagues at UCLA for 42 years (1973–2015) until Lena's death in October, 2015, and collaborated on many research projects. After retiring from active teaching in 2002, they coauthored a major national study on spirituality in higher education, which became available in book form in 2011. The Astins have two sons, John Alexander (Doctor of Psychology) and Paul Allen (Doctor of Education), and three granddaughters, Erin, Amalia and Ila.

He died on May 18, 2022.
