= NCSL International =

Global non-profit organization focused on metrology

- Abbreviation: NCSLI
- Formation: September 15, 1961
- Type: Non-profit
- Location: 800 Roosevelt Road, Building C, Suite 312, Glen Ellyn, IL 60137, USA
- Region served: International
- Members: Organizations and individuals with an interest in metrology (the science of measurement), including academic, scientific, industrial, commercial and government facilities.
- President: Mrs. Georgette Macdonald 2023 - 2024
- Website: www.ncsli.org

NCSL International (NCSLI) (from the founding name "National Conference of Standards Laboratories") is a global, non-profit organization whose membership is open to any organization with an interest in metrology (the science of measurement) and its application in research, development, education, and commerce.

== History ==
On June 22, 1960, at the National Bureau of Standards (NBS) in Boulder, Colorado, Harvey Lance presented a paper titled "The Nation's Electronic Standards Program: Where Do We Stand?" suggesting the need for an organization of standards laboratories to promote cooperative efforts for solving the common problems faced by measurement and testing laboratories. The next morning a committee was formed to "investigate the possible organization, scope, and objectives appropriate for an organization of standards laboratories". September 15, 1961, the National Conference of Standards Laboratories (NCSL) was formally established with NBS as its sponsor. Primarily due to the growth and acquired ability of NCSL to run its own affairs, NBS (currently known as the National Institute of Standards and Technology or NIST) ended its sponsorship role in July 1986. The two agencies maintain a close and collaborative relationship.

During the 1960s and early 1970s the Cold War climate caused a dilemma for NCSL which included many US aerospace and military facilities amongst its membership. There was concern over complying with US State Department regulations relating to technology transfer and discussion while allowing non-US entities to participate. NCSL considered national security a serious enough issue to warrant US-only membership. In 1974, however, the board of directors decided the substantial advantages of an open international membership outweighed the security considerations and NCSL enrollment was opened to non-US organizations. In 1975, Graham Cameron from the Canadian Department of National Defence became the first non-US delegate to serve on the board. In 1976 the first International Region was established. By 1996 non-US organizations comprised roughly 15% of the total membership. In the year 2000, NCSL began the process of formally changing its name to NCSL International to better represent its membership.

== Cooperative activities ==
=== Annual conference ===
The inclusion of "Conference" in NCSLI demonstrates the importance the organization's founders placed on convening periodic conferences. The annual NCSL International Workshop & Symposium is a four-day event held in late July/early August in a variety of locations. Papers are presented by speakers during technical sessions occurring throughout the conference. A Best Paper Award is given to the highest scoring presentation in several categories associated with the theme for that year. The Dr. Allen V. Astin Award is presented to the overall best paper.

Two annual events are hosted by NCSL International. The first is a Technical Exchange, were tutorials had given on various Metrology Topics. The second is an annual Workshop & Symposium that includes an exhibit hall with over one hundred companies showcasing a variety of goods and services including calibration hardware and software, management tools, education and training organizations, calibration labs and accreditation services. Tutorials are offered two days before the start of the conference and one day following. Beyond technical information, the conference allows the opportunity to network with people who share common interests and numerous meetings are held by the board of directors and committees.

=== Region/section meetings and committees ===
NCSL International is organized in regions and sections around the world and each region/section is guided and directed by a volunteer coordinator. Meetings are held periodically as a way for professionals in the local metrology community to assemble, network and learn from each other. A typical meeting involves a tour of the host facility, speakers and presentations, exhibitors and updates from the region/section coordinator. A total of seventy-four national and international sections/regions were active in 2006.

Committee participation enables members to confer with colleagues with common interests, similar challenges and solution strategies specific to their industry. Each committee is open to all members to volunteer, share ideas and work on projects. Some committees concentrate on the inner workings and business of NCSL International itself. This would include publication oversight, conference planning and site selection, by-laws and guidelines. Other committees were established for discipline-specific, special interest or industry groups. Under measurement science and technology, committees range in focus from automatic test and calibration systems to chemical and dimensional metrology; from deadweight pressure gauges to the triple point of argon. Industrial programs features committees for healthcare, airline, automotive, and small business metrology. Documentary standards encompass calibration systems, laboratory facilities, measurement decision risk, and accreditation resources. A total of sixty-two committees (in 2006), composed solely of volunteers, endeavor to advance the work of NCSL International. It is from the effort of these committees that all NCSL International published standards originate.

== Learning and development ==
=== Education and outreach ===
"If you talk to almost any person involved in the metrology profession about new talent entering the field, you'll probably get the same response: 'There are not enough young people entering the field to replace the many baby boomers getting ready to retire.'" -Christopher L. Grachanen

A search of the US Department of Labor Standard Occupational Classification System (SOC) will result in few references to metrology. Although it does contain a listing for 'metrologist', this has been deemed grossly inadequate by those employed in the profession. The SOC is the basis for the Occupational Outlook Handbook, a publication of the United States Department of Labor's Bureau of Labor Statistics, accepted as a reference for guidance counselors, job seekers and those planning a career path. In a joint effort between ASQ-MQD and NCSLI a survey was conducted to generate job titles with descriptions within the field of metrology. The titles proposed are, in general order of hierarchy: Calibration Technician, Calibration Engineer, and Metrologist. Application has been filed to include this data in the SOC update of 2010. The aim is to increase awareness amongst new talent that may be interested in joining the metrological profession.

To further the goal of encouraging interest in metrology as a career, NCSL International supports scholarships to institutions and individuals. The general scholarship program awards money to accredited schools that offer metrology education. NCSLI is also an institutional sponsor, along with ASQ-MQD and the Measurement Science Conference, of the Joe D Simmons Memorial Scholarship given to individuals with a strong academic record and an interest in measurement science. NCSLI applied for and received inclusion in the Combined Federal Campaign (CFC).

=== Workplace and professional development ===
The NCSL International business office located in Boulder, CO maintains a training facility and a multimedia training aids library covering both technical and managerial topics. The annual conference offers technical sessions covering up-to-date information as well as more detailed half or full day tutorials. Available more locally, region/section meetings feature speakers and Regional Training Events provide both classroom and hands on learning. Further, NCSLI supports management and human resource departments by clarifying job descriptions and career paths, providing information on appropriate certifications and qualifications and by awarding continuing education units or CEU's for attending and completing many of the development opportunities offered.

== Publications ==
=== Periodicals ===
NCSLI Measure, The Journal of Measurement Science (ISSN 19315775) is a scientific and technical journal published quarterly by NSCL International. Measure is written primarily for metrology professionals in calibrations laboratories, such as lab managers, engineers and technicians. Issues are composed of peer-reviewed technical articles and up-to-date information on calibration techniques, uncertainty analysis, measurement standards, quality processes and laboratory accreditation.

NCSL International also publishes Metrologist, NCSLI Worldwide News (ISSN 1940-2988) to provide news and information about the organization and its members. Metrologist is a glossy quarterly containing reports and updates from committees, regions and the board of directors, and featuring member news and trade information. The first Newsletter was printed June 1, 1962 and contained six pages. The Newsletter increased in content and became the primary communication tool of NCSL until 2007 when it was discontinued. Metrologist was designed as an extended successor of the NCSL Newsletter.

=== Standards ===
As committees address various issues it sometimes becomes apparent that other metrologists would be interested in the result of their investigations. This often leads to publications including: recommended practices (RP), recommended intrinsic/derived standards practices (RISP), or laboratory management publications (LMP). NCSL International also writes and/or adopts national standards as a standards writing body recognized by the American National Standards Institute (ANSI). Of these RP-1 (Establishment and Adjustment of Calibration Intervals), RP-6 (Calibration Control Systems for the Biomedical and Pharmaceutical Industry), RP-7 (Laboratory Design), RP-14 (Guide to Selecting Standards-Laboratory Environments) and ANSI/NCSL Z540 (US Guide to the Expression of Uncertainty in Measurement) are referenced in the metrology textbook The Metrology Handbook.

== See also ==
- Outline of metrology and measurement
