= Alexander Maranghides =

American fire protection engineer

- Education: B.S. Mechanical Engineering; M.S. Fire Protection Engineering, Worcester Polytechnic Institute
- Known for: Wildland–urban interface (WUI) fire research; large‑scale fire testing
- Awards: Samuel J. Heyman Service to America Medal (2025); NIST Gold Medal (2023); NIST Bronze Medal
- Scientific career
- Fields: Fire protection engineering, Wildland–urban interface fire research
- Institutions: National Institute of Standards and Technology (NIST)

Alexander Maranghides is an American fire protection engineer at the National Institute of Standards and Technology (NIST). He is best known for his research on wildland–urban interface (WUI) fires and large-scale fire testing.

== Education and early career ==
Maranghides earned both a Bachelor of Science in Mechanical Engineering and a Master of Science in Fire Protection Engineering from Worcester Polytechnic Institute. Prior to joining NIST, he worked for seven years at the U.S. Naval Research Laboratory, serving as Test Director for the halon replacement program and co-inventing enhancements to gaseous suppression systems.

== Career at NIST ==
At NIST, Maranghides led the Large Fire Laboratory and has overseen hundreds of large-scale fire experiments. For over twenty years, he has focused on wildland–urban interface fires. He led all four of NIST’s WUI fire case-study reconstructions, including the Waldo Canyon Fire and the 2018 Camp Fire in Paradise, California. His work has informed building standards and regional fire safety guidance.

Maranghides leads WUI research combining field data collection, post-fire reconstruction, and controlled experiments. His team has investigated major wildfire disasters like Waldo Canyon and Paradise Camp Fire, identifying ember vulnerabilities, evaluating evacuation protocols, and developing guidance such as the ESCAPE framework and HMM.

== Awards and honours ==
- Samuel J. Heyman Service to America Medal (2025) — Awarded June 16, 2025, by the Partnership for Public Service in recognition of “decades of important research into how fires that occur in communities adjacent to wildlands spread, what can be done to prevent them and how to protect life and property.”
- NIST Gold Medal (2023) — As part of a group for “technical innovations that revealed for the first time the complex behavior of WUI fires and resulted in practical tools.”
- NIST Bronze Medal — Recognized by NIST for contributions to fire science and community fire resilience.

== Selected publications ==
- Maranghides, A., Link, E. D., Nazare, S., Hawks, S., McDougald, J., Quarles, S. L., & Gorham, D. J. (2022). WUI Structure/parcel/community fire hazard mitigation methodology. National Institute of Standards and Technology.
- Maranghides, A., & Link, E. (2023). WUI Fire Evacuation and Sheltering Considerations: Assessment, Planning, and Execution (ESCAPE). National Institute of Standards and Technology.
