= Allen V. Astin =

American physicist (1904–1984)

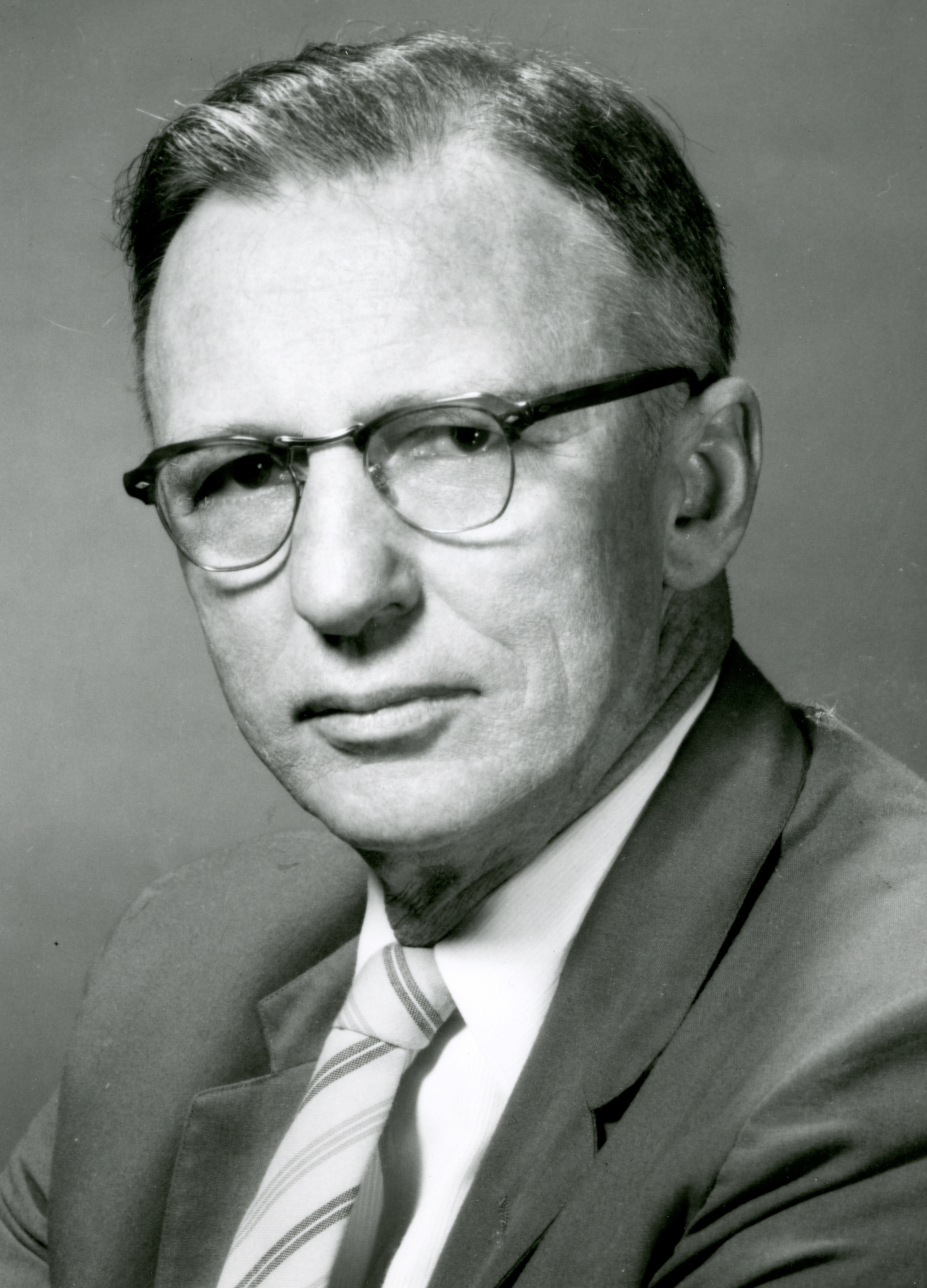

5th Director of the National Bureau of Standards
- In office 1951–1969
- President: Harry S. Truman; Dwight D. Eisenhower; John F. Kennedy; Lyndon B. Johnson
- Preceded by: Edward Condon
- Succeeded by: Lewis M. Branscomb

Personal details
- Born: Allen Varley Astin; June 12, 1904 Salt Lake City, Utah, U.S.
- Died: January 28, 1984 (aged 79) Bethesda, Maryland, U.S.
- Spouse: Margaret L. Mackenzie
- Children: John; Alexander
- Relatives: Mackenzie Astin (grandson); Sean Astin (adoptive grandson)
- Scientific career
- Education: University of Utah; New York University
- Fields: Physics
- Workplaces: National Bureau of Standards
- Thesis: New method for measuring the dielectric constants of conducting liquids (1929)
- Doctoral advisor: William A. Lynch

Allen Varley Astin (June 12, 1904 – January 28, 1984) was an American physicist who served as the fifth director of the United States National Bureau of Standards (now the National Institute of Standards and Technology) from 1951 until 1969. During the Second World War he worked on the proximity fuse. He was an advocate for introduction of metric weights and measures to the United States. He was an elected member to the American Philosophical Society, the American Academy of Arts and Sciences, and the National Academy of Sciences.

== Early years ==
Allen Astin was the eldest of three children of a school teacher in Utah. Astin's father died when he was only four years old. He graduated from the University of Utah physics program and in 1928 was granted a PhD in physics from New York University. That same year, Astin obtained a two-year fellowship for studies at Johns Hopkins University. Upon completing the fellowship he secured a staff position at the National Bureau of Standards, eventually working his way up to his appointment as director in May, 1952.

== AD-X2 controversy ==
The National Bureau of Standards (NBS) began researching electric batteries in 1917 as part of the war effort. In its annual report for 1918, the bureau announced: "The need of the development of specifications and methods of test for electric batteries has long been recognized; but facilities have not been available to undertake this work. The needs of the military departments have recently become so urgent that the study of batteries has been undertaken." In addition to testing batteries for other government agencies, the NBS also tested battery additives of various kinds purported to improve battery life and performance. Even though testing continued until 1957, no additive was ever found to have beneficial effects.

As far back as 1931, in order to respond to an increasing number of requests for battery additive testing, the Bureau issued Letter Circular (LC) 302, Battery Compounds and Solutions. The letter stated: "The later tests confirm the Bureau's previous conclusions that these materials do not charge storage batteries nor do they materially improve the performance of the batteries."

The controversy began when an entrepreneur, Jess M. Ritchie, CEO of Pioneers, a company based in Oakland, California, began marketing an automotive battery additive under the brand name "Protecto-Charge", a reformulated "AD-X2", shortly after the end of World War II. By 1948, sales of Protecto-Charge had started to increase, but when Ritchie was made aware of LC 302, he became concerned enough that he used his connections with the Oakland Better Business Bureau to put pressure on the NBS to test his product.

George W. Vinal, chief of the electrochemistry section of the Electricity Division at NBS, on his own initiative, separate from his work at the NBS, carried out a limited test of AD-X2, for the Federal Trade Commission (FTC), with results showing that AD-X2 was a simple mixture of sodium sulfate and magnesium sulfate, and it showed no beneficial effect on a battery.

Despite its stated position that battery additives were worthless and partly in response to the mounting political pressure, the NBS eventually went ahead and quietly tested AD-X2 in early 1949, with the expected result that it had no beneficial effect. This wasn't the result that Ritchie wanted, and he continued escalating his political campaign. In 1953, a year after Astin was appointed director of the NBS, the US Post Office, in conjunction with the FTC, issued a postal fraud order banning the use of mailings to promote Ritchie's product. Sinclair Weeks, the recently appointed Secretary of Commerce, called Astin in and demanded his resignation, which he gave immediately.

The politically driven circumstances of Astin's dismissal was picked up by the press and political cartoonists. An article by Drew Pearson, a Washington Post syndicated columnist, led to a national uproar, especially in the scientific community. The Federation of American Scientists and the American Physical Society protested the politicization of the NBS with its reputation for unbiased, objective, science-based research. Over 400 staff members of the NBS threatened to resign.

Chastened after weeks of controversy and Congressional testimony by Astin and others, Secretary Weeks reversed his decision and reinstated Astin on August 22, 1953, some five months after demanding he resign.

== Personal life ==
Allen Astin was the father of actor John Astin and educator Dr. Alexander Astin, and the grandfather of actor Mackenzie Astin and adoptive grandfather of actor Sean Astin.

The Allen V. Astin Measurement Science Award, first issued in 1984, is presented by the United States Department of Commerce for achievement in metrology. The American National Standards Institute issues the Astin-Polk International Standards Medal for distinguished service in standardization, measurement or certification. NCSL International issues the Allen V. Astin award for best overall conference paper.

Government offices
Preceded by Edward Condon	5th Director of the National Bureau of Standards; 1951 – 1969	Succeeded by Lewis M. Branscomb
