= International Centre for Diffraction Data =

The International Centre for Diffraction Data (ICDD) maintains a database of powder diffraction patterns, the Powder Diffraction File (PDF), including the d-spacings (related to angle of diffraction) and relative intensities of observable diffraction peaks. Patterns may be experimentally determined, or computed based on crystal structure and Bragg's law. It is most often used to identify substances based on x-ray diffraction data, and is designed for use with a diffractometer. The PDF contains more than a million unique material data sets. Each data set contains diffraction, crystallographic and bibliographic data, as well as experimental, instrument and sampling conditions, and select physical properties in a common standardized format.

The organization was founded in 1969 as the Joint Committee on Powder Diffraction Standards. In 1978, the name was changed to International Centre for Diffraction Data to better encompass the global commitment of the endeavor.

The ICDD is a nonprofit scientific organization working in the field of X-ray analysis and materials characterization. It produces materials databases, characterization tools, and educational materials, as well as organizing and supporting global workshops, clinics and conferences.

Products and services of the ICDD include the paid subscription based Powder Diffraction File databases (PDF-2, PDF-5+, PDF-4/Minerals, PDF-4/Axiom, and ICDD Server Edition), educational workshops, webinars, clinics, and symposia. It is a sponsor of the Denver X-ray Conference and the Pharmaceutical Powder X-ray Diffraction Symposium. It also publishes the journals Advances in X-ray Analysis and Powder Diffraction.

In 2019, Materials Data, also known as MDI, merged with ICDD. Materials Data creates JADE software used to collect, analyze, and simulate XRD data and solve issues in an array of materials science projects.

In 2020, the ICDD and the Cambridge Crystallographic Data Centre, which curates and maintains the Cambridge Structural Database, announced a data partnership.

On 1 September 2026, ICDD released their 2026-2027 databases. Release 2027 of the Powder Diffraction File™ (PDF®) contains 1,149,100+ material data sets. Each data set contains diffraction, crystallographic, and bibliographic data, as well as experimental, instrument, and sampling conditions, and select physical properties in a common standardized format.

== See also ==
- Powder diffraction
- Crystallography
