= Virtual Cybernetic Building Testbed =

Building automation

The Virtual Cybernetic Building Testbed (VCBT) is a whole building emulator located at the National Institute of Standards and Technology in Gaithersburg, Maryland. It is designed with enough flexibility to be capable of reproducibly simulating normal operation and a variety of faulty and hazardous conditions that might occur in a cybernetic building. It serves as a testbed for investigating the interactions between integrated building systems and a wide range of issues important to the development of cybernetic building technology.

The VCBT consists of a variety of simulation models that together emulate the characteristics and performance of a cybernetic building system. The simulation models are interfaced to real state-of-the-art BACnet speaking control systems to provide a hybrid software/hardware testbed that can be used to develop and evaluate control strategies and control products that use the BACnet communication protocol. The simulation models used are based on versions of HVACSIM+ and CFAST.
