= AD-X2 =

Additive purported to extend lead–acid automotive battery life

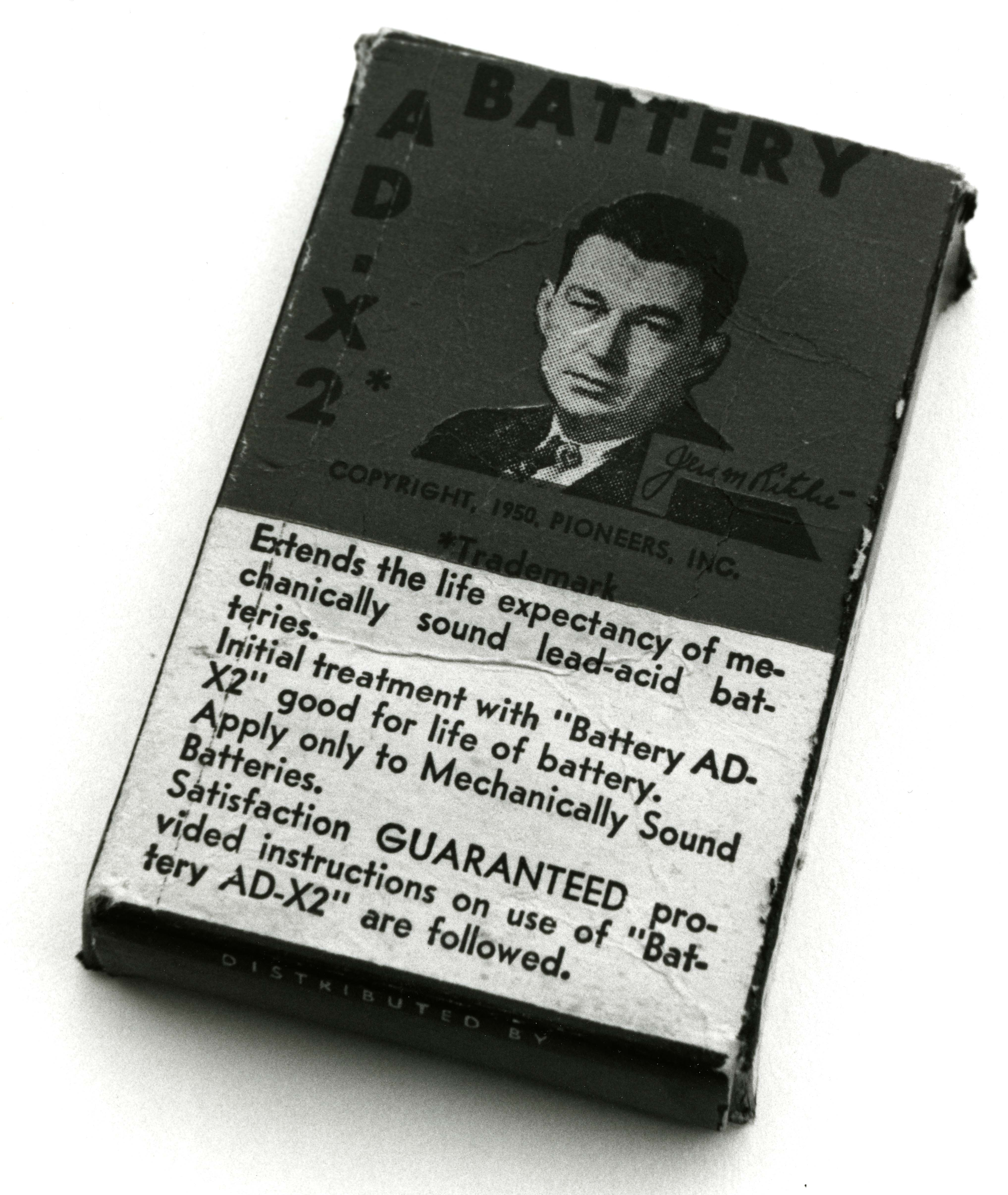
Package of AD-X2

AD-X2 was an additive purported to extend lead–acid automotive battery life, marketed by California bulldozer operator Jess M. Ritchie in the late 1940s and early 1950s. After it was declared ineffective by the National Bureau of Standards (NBS), and other government agencies accused Ritchie of fraud, a media blitz alleging collusion between battery manufacturers and the government led Commerce Secretary Sinclair Weeks to request NBS director Allen V. Astin’s resignation. After subsequent Senate hearings, the NBS's position was vindicated, and Astin was reinstated.

== Overview ==
Lead is a main ingredient in lead–acid batteries, which were in short supply after World War II, this led to great public demand to improve the life span of automotive batteries. Jess M. Ritchie saw that there was a possibility of making a business out of this.

Since World War I, NBS had tested numerous battery additives, also known as "battery dopes". Those tests had been done for the Post Office Department and for the Federal Trade Commission (FTC), since they are concerned about protecting consumers against fraudulent advertising claims. None of those battery additives were found to be beneficial, which led to NBS publishing Letter Circular 302: Battery Compounds and Solutions in 1931, laying out its findings and warning the public against the use of battery additives. This also led to the National Better Business Bureau (NBBB) in New York publishing Facts About Battery Dopes, which uses the findings of Letter Circular 302, condemning battery additives.

Jess M. Ritchie was an entrepreneur who came from poverty. In 1947, he brought a partnership to the company Pioneers, Inc., which made a battery additive named Protecto Charge. Ritchie found out that Protecto Charge was ineffective. He, together with former UC-Berkeley chemist Merle Randall, changed the formula of Protecto Charge and released it under the new name "Battery AD-X2".

== History ==
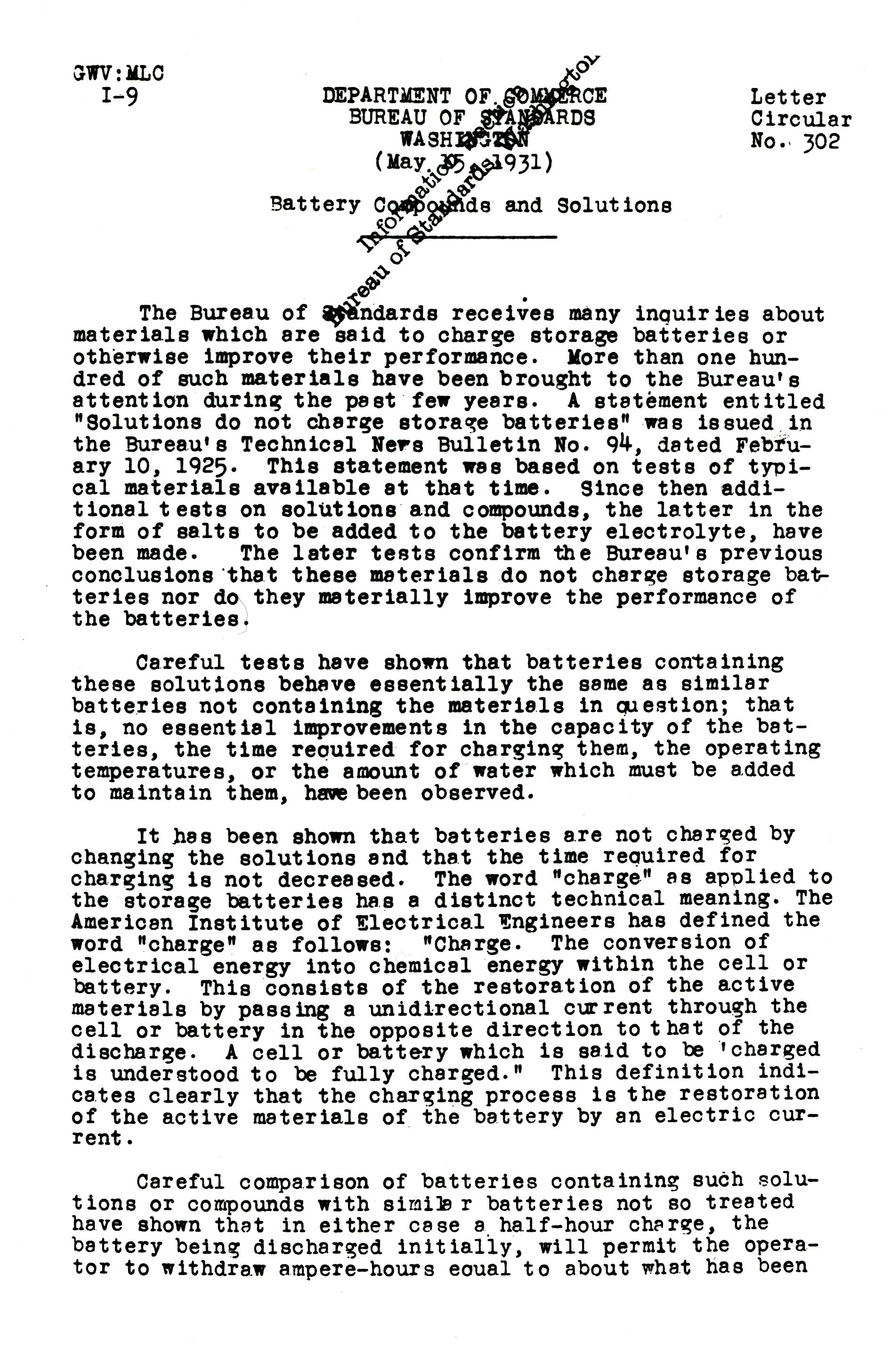
Letter Circular No. 302

=== Launch ===
AD-X2 was launched by the company Pioneers, Inc. on the market in 1947. They never patented the product; they chose to keep it a trade secret instead. In 1948, Ritchie learned about a pamphlet named Letter Circular 302 by NBS, which was being circulated among battery users. Pioneers, Inc. wrote a letter to the NBS and told them that AD-X2 is actually beneficial and told them to test the product because Letter Circular 302 was then outdated, since it was written in 1931. Also, the company had the support of the Oakland Better Business Bureau (OBBB) in Oakland, California, since apparently his customers in the area were satisfied.

In 1948, George W. Vinal, chief of the electrochemistry section of the Electricity Division at NBS, who learned the thing about battery additives over and over again, put the letter written by Pioneers, Inc., aside. The NBBB, which has written about Facts About Battery Dopes, put pressure on Vinal to issue an up-to-date revision of Letter Circular 302. Meanwhile, the OBBB, which is where Pioneers, Inc. was based, put pressure on Vinal to test AD-X2. Also in the late 1948, U.S. Senator William Knowland from Oakland, also requested tests to Vinal.

=== Private test ===
The NBS has two policies, stating that it should not conduct commercial testing of materials unless requested by another agency of the Government, and that it should never mention commercial products in its publications. That was why Vinal never officially tested the additive in his capacity as an NBS employee. Nevertheless, Vinal, on his own initiative separate from its work on the NBS, did carry out a limited test of AD-X2 along with other tests he performed for the FTC. The results showed that AD-X2 was a simple mixture of sodium and magnesium sulfate, and it showed no beneficial effect on the battery. Vinal did not disclose these results. In 1949, five military installations tested AD-X2; three found it without any effect, but two, using methods that Vinal did not consider rigorous, reported positive results. This led to concerns from the NBBB about the validity of its battery additive publication Facts About Battery Dopes, and it further pressed Vinal for a revision of Letter Circular 302. Since a new revision takes some time, and in view of the pressing interest in AD-X2 and other additives, NBS reissued Letter Circular 302 with a letter signed by Edward U. Condon which summarized Letter Circular 302. Neither AD-X2 nor any other battery additive was mentioned by name.

=== Official test ===
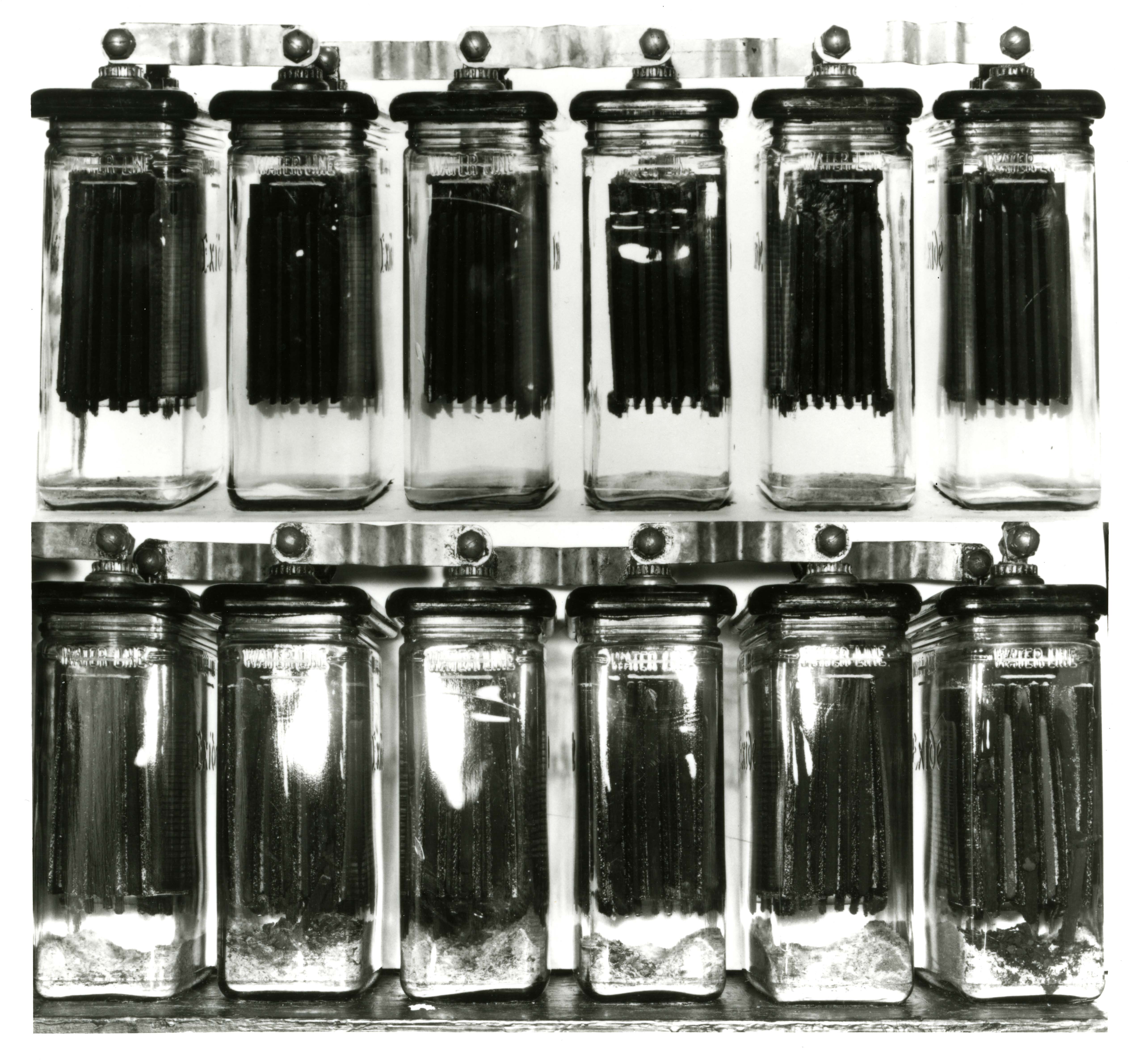
National Bureau of Standards testing AD-X2 on six lead-acid batteries

The NBBB, having the reissued Letter Circular 302 from NBS, asked FTC to take action against Pioneers, Inc. on the grounds that its advertising claims for AD-X2 were false, and notified Vinal that it was doing so. This led to the FTC to send an examiner to Oakland, and they found out that there is a wide satisfaction among AD-X2 users, including the military. Because of this, on March 22, 1950, the FTC made a formal request for a test to be conducted at NBS. Since the NBS requirement of requiring another agency of the Government to request for the test has been fulfilled, NBS has conducted its first official test on AD-X2.

Tests were conducted, the results of the previous tests Vinal had made were incorporated, and the NBS reported to the FTC on May 11, 1950, that these tests had failed to demonstrate any significant beneficial effect on the battery.

Ritchie had continued his advertising claims that the NBBB and NBS statements did not apply to AD-X2 because it had not been tested, and told that NBBB and NBS have a bias against the "little guy" and are conspiring with the big battery companies. This put intense pressure on Vinal, who saw that identifying AD-X2 by name as the only way of resolving the issue.

The NBS was now in a dilemma; in order to resolve the issue, they would either have to abandon a fundamental NBS policy about not mentioning commercial products in its publications, or remain silent and thereby give implicit approval to AD-X2. This also led to questions about the impartiality and objectivity of the NBS whether they are biased against the "little guy".

=== NBS mentioned AD-X2 by name ===
The NBS decided to break their policy. NBS permitted the NBBB to publish in August 1950 a leaflet entitled Battery Compounds and Solutions containing a long statement in which NBS referred specifically to AD-X2:

In view of the tests made here and in competent laboratories elsewhere, it is our belief that AD-X2 is not essentially different from other preparations containing magnesium sulfate and sodium sulfate, and that as a class these materials are not beneficial. The results of recent tests are being prepared for issuance as a Bureau circular, but in the meantime we see no reason to modify Letter Circular 302.

This was the first time that the NBS mentioned a brand name. That statement was never made before, nor has it been since. In the same leaflet, Ritchie was permitted to rebut NBS's findings, and he brought up field tests, which sparked a nationwide issue about the National Bureau of Standards versus the "little guy" called "The AD-X2 Controversy" or "The AD-X2 Affair".

It has been mentioned many times by both Dr. Randall and ourselves that it is difficult to make a really definitive laboratory test of Battery AD-X2 and that the only practical means of determining the value of the product is through field test.

This controversy has now made it into the news. In December 1950, Newsweek published an article reporting the favorable military results and the satisfaction of AD-X2 customers. Ritchie's sales skyrocketed.

The FTC examiner that was sent to Oakland, feeling the NBS report was not definitive because of the lack of field tests and because of the satisfactory experience of users in the area, recommended that the FTC drop its case against Pioneers, Inc. The FTC did not accept the recommendation and pushed the case forward against Pioneers, Inc.

== Controversy ==
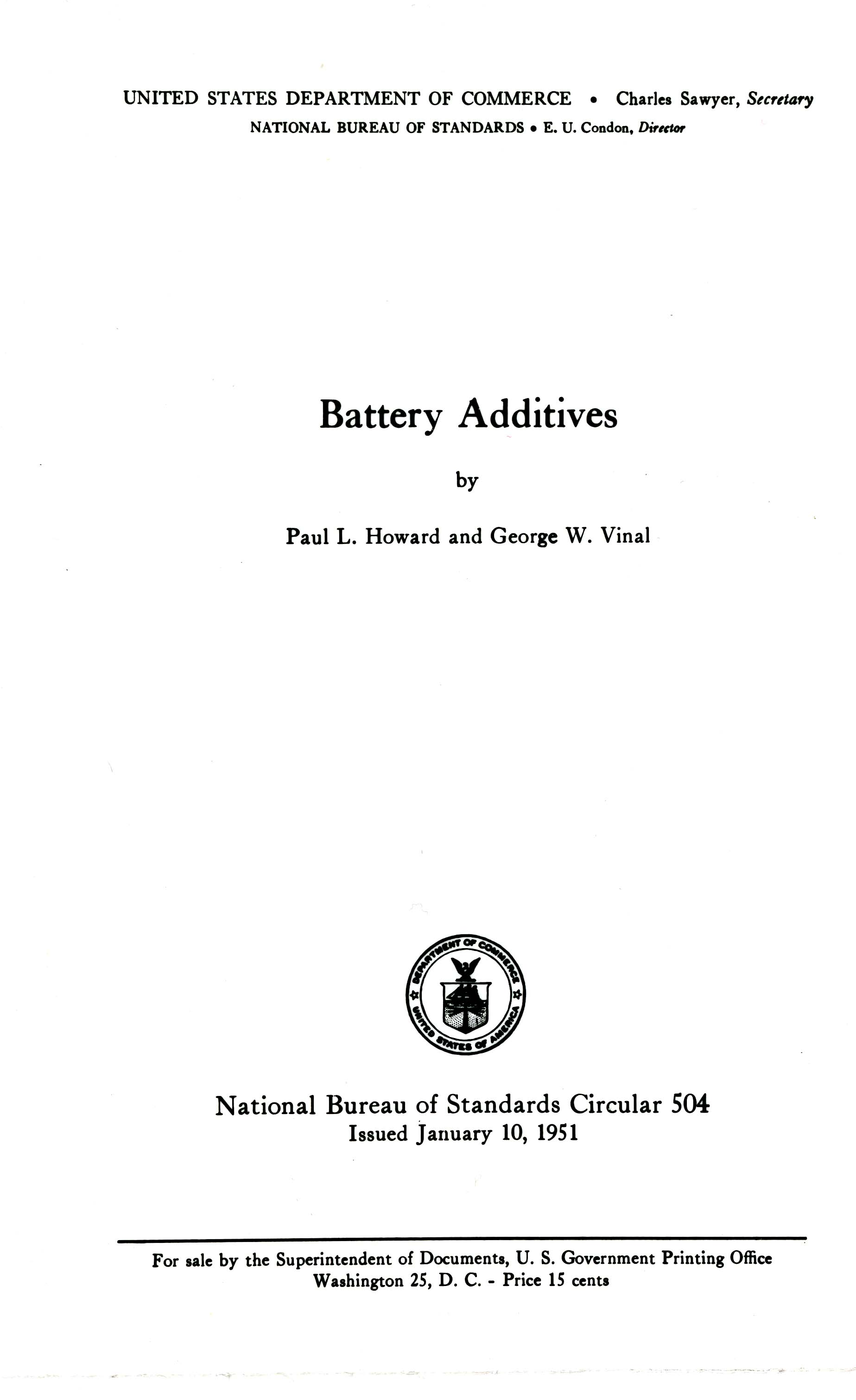
NBS Circular 504 on Battery Additives

=== NBS issued a revision of Letter Circular 302 ===
On January 10, 1951, NBS issued its revision of Letter Circular 302, entitled NBS Circular 504 on Battery Additives. It showed in considerable detail the results of new laboratory tests, with the same results as previously: no battery additive was found to be useful. No battery additives were identified by name. These results were published in the trade press, which refused to publish Ritchie's side of the story, and in many cases, refused to accept his advertising. Ritchie's sales plummeted.

=== Congress involvement ===
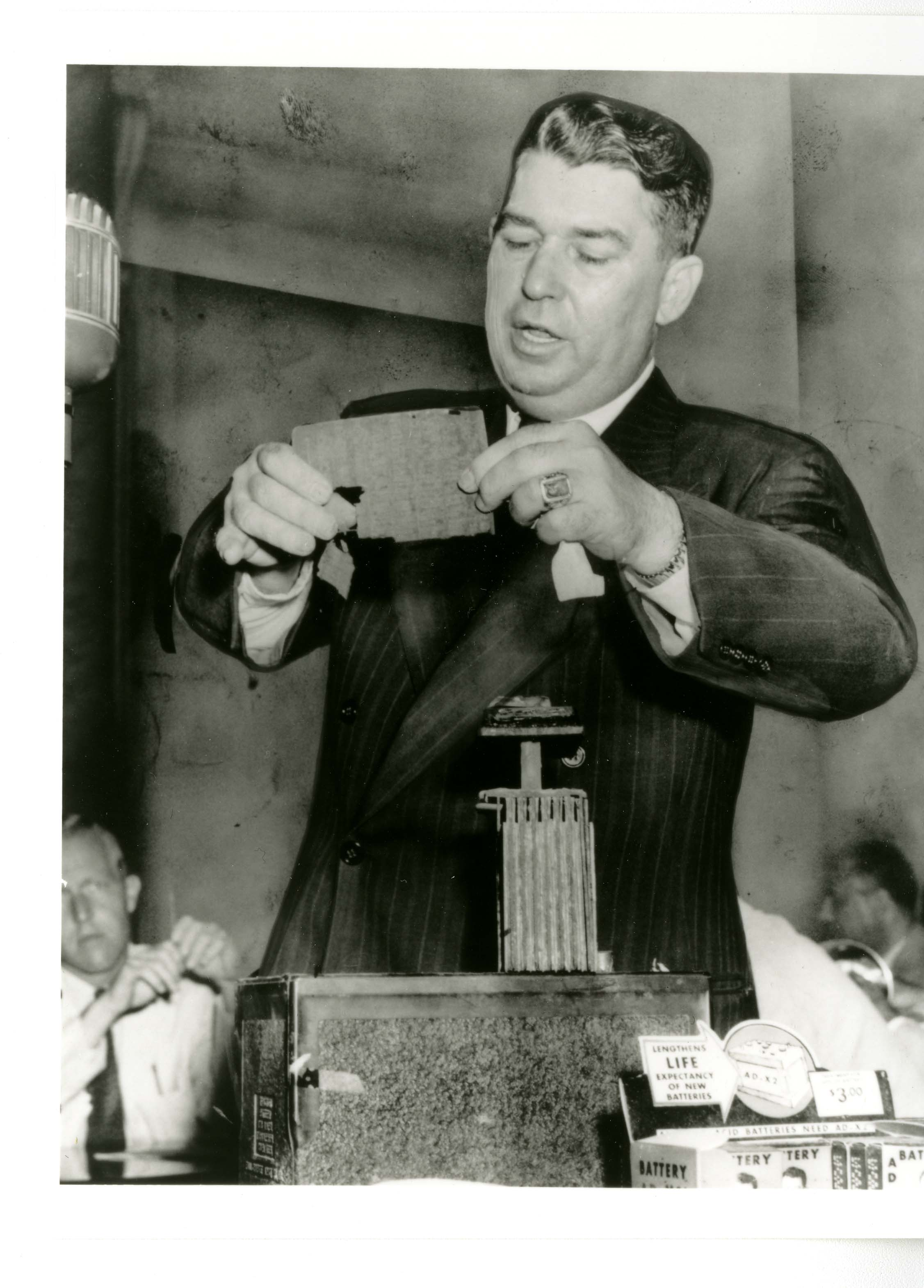
Jess M. Ritchie demonstrating AD-X2 on the Senate Select Committee on Small Business

Knowing that Pioneers, Inc. sales plummeted, Ritchie began to attack the NBS. In August 1951, Ritchie urged his distributors to write to Congress, with the aim of causing a congressional investigation of NBS. His position was that he, a small businessman, was being unfairly harassed and persecuted by an agency of the Government. Congress was flooded by mail. Senators and members of Congress wrote to NBS several times. The volume of mail became so great that in the fall of 1951, the NBS issued a mimeographed leaflet which stated that the results in Circular 504 were unambiguous:

Battery additives were worthless.

Allen V. Astin, as an acting director of the NBS, were affected by this heated controversy. He was immediately involved with the AD-X2 problem and attempted to bring it under control. He entered into correspondence with Ritchie. Ritchie went to the Senate Select Committee on Small Business to demonstrate AD-X2.

=== 2nd official test ===
In February 1952, the FTC, responding to the pressure from Ritchie and from the Senate, and feeling that it needed more tests to uphold its position against Pioneers, Inc., asked NBS to conduct more tests. In early March, the Post Office Department notified Ritchie that it was accusing him of “conducting an unlawful enterprise through the mails” and scheduled a hearing for April 26, which it subsequently delayed, awaiting the results of NBS tests.

The tests conducted by the NBS were extensive, and as expected, they also showed AD-X2 to be useless. But the results were immediately attacked by Ritchie as being technically flawed because the charging procedure was inappropriate, despite the fact that it was the same one used by Randall.

=== Public test ===
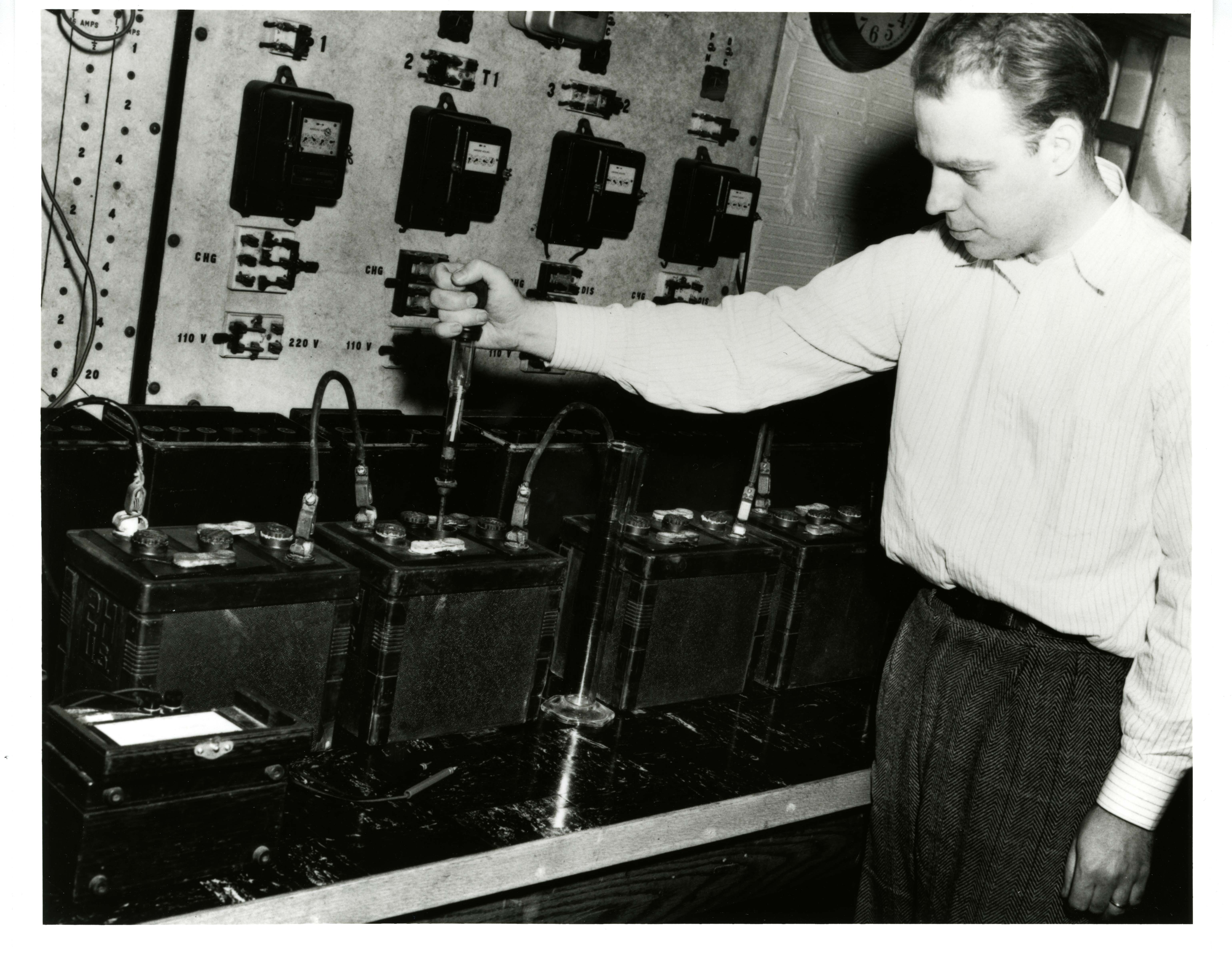
Herbert J. Reed of the Electrochemistry Section measuring specific gravity on a battery

Astin decided to resolve the situation by performing a public test using a procedure that would be agreed to by all parties. A procedure was agreed upon in writing, except for one point, which turned out to be crucial. This concerned the specific gravity of the electrolyte. Ritchie had wanted to add water if, during charging, the specific gravity rose above 1.280; the NBS did not want to add water at all. Astin finally thought he had a compromise in which the specific gravity would not be allowed to rise above 1.325, and the tests were performed in June 1952.

Astin was now fully in charge of the public testing of AD-X2. Some battery cells were treated and some are controls. But which cells were which was not known to the personnel conducting the tests, only Astin knows. The NBS statisticians developed a random sampling scheme. Astin and a technician assistant went alone into the laboratory. Consulting a chart prepared by the statisticians, Astin told the technician which cells were to have AD-X2 added and which were not. During this procedure, he asked the technician to leave the room, and he personally affixed numbers to all the cells. Only Astin knew which numbers corresponded to the treated cells. The tests were run by the laboratory personnel over the next few weeks.

On July 15, 1952, the NBS reported its results. AD-X2 showed no beneficial effects. Ritchie also said that the tests were not properly done, he had never agreed to the permitted increase in specific gravity, and the tests were flawed in ten other ways.

=== Ritchie declining to NBS's tests ===
It was now clear to Astin, who believed that he had obtained Ritchie's agreement on the conduct of the tests, that any tests conducted by the NBS, were not acceptable to Ritchie. The Senate Small Business Committee took Ritchie's side on the validity of the tests.

On September 29, at a meeting in Astin's office, it was agreed that further tests were necessary, but no decision was made about who was to conduct the tests. Blake O’Connor, one of the staff members of the Senate Select Committee on Small Business, asked the Massachusetts Institute of Technology (MIT) to carry out the tests. MIT, contrary to their policy, agreed to do the tests. Astin decided that because of Ritchie's attitude toward the NBS, it would be better if MIT carried out their tests independently.

=== MIT test ===
Harold C. Weber, professor of chemical engineering at MIT, started their test in October 1952. On December 17, 1952, the results of the MIT tests were delivered to the committee. The report did find differences attributable to the introduction of AD-X2, but the differences are minuscule and they refrained from concluding whether such differences were practical real-world significance. In fact, it turned out later that these differences were only observable when using an electrolyte that was so dilute that it has no relationship to actual use conditions. Astin went to MIT to discuss this, but nothing came of the discussions. The Senate Small Business Committee ignored the results and issued a press release stating that the MIT results completely supported AD-X2 claims. Keith J. Laidler, an expert on chemical kinetics, then issued a statement:

The MIT tests ... constitute by far the most thorough scientific tests of the effectiveness of AD-X2. They demonstrate without reasonable doubt that this material is in fact valuable, and give complete support to the claims of the manufacturer.

=== Conflicting results ===
The MIT statement was widely reported by radio and in the press. The NBS, MIT, and indeed the whole scientific community, were in an awkward situation. Two of the nation's most highly respected laboratories had apparently arrived at conflicting conclusions on what appeared to be a simple problem. The scientific method itself was being called into question, as were the motivations and objectivity of the NBS scientists. The NBS itself was at the lowest point in its history.

=== Change of administration ===
In 1952, Dwight D. Eisenhower was elected as the 34th president of the United States, vowed to "clean up the mess in Washington". He then appointed Sinclair Weeks, a businessman from Boston, as the Secretary of Commerce and promised to "cut out the dead wood". Weeks' mail was flooded by letters from Ritchie and his supporters claiming that Pioneers, Inc., was being unfairly persecuted by an antagonistic bureaucracy. Ritchie's case was strengthened when on February 24, 1953, the Post Office Department, in spite of the MIT tests, halted Ritchie's mail because of fraudulent advertising. Political pressure on the Post Office Department from the Senate Small Business Committee caused the suspension of the halted mail a few days later. Weeks ordered his assistant secretary Craig R. Sheaffer to investigate the AD-X2 affair.

=== Astin’s resignation ===
In January 1953, Astin wrote a memorandum to Weeks containing a proposal that was to prove crucial for the future of the NBS. He proposed that the National Academy of Sciences be enlisted to evaluate the NBS with respect to both the AD-X2 affair and all its other operations. But Astin never saw Weeks. Weeks had placed the whole matter in the hands of Sheaffer. Astin later tried again to see Weeks, with the same result. As a result of his assistant secretary investigations, Sheaffer came to the conclusion that there were sufficient grounds to question the reliability of the NBS tests, and on March 24, 1953, Weeks asked Astin to resign.

Although the Director of the National Bureau of Standards serves at the pleasure of the President, it is a post in which the incumbent is traditionally not replaced at the change of administration, but Astin, apparently feeling that this action was part of Weeks’ general housecleaning and not personal, resigned. On March 31, 1953, his letter of resignation was at the White House.

== Aftermath ==
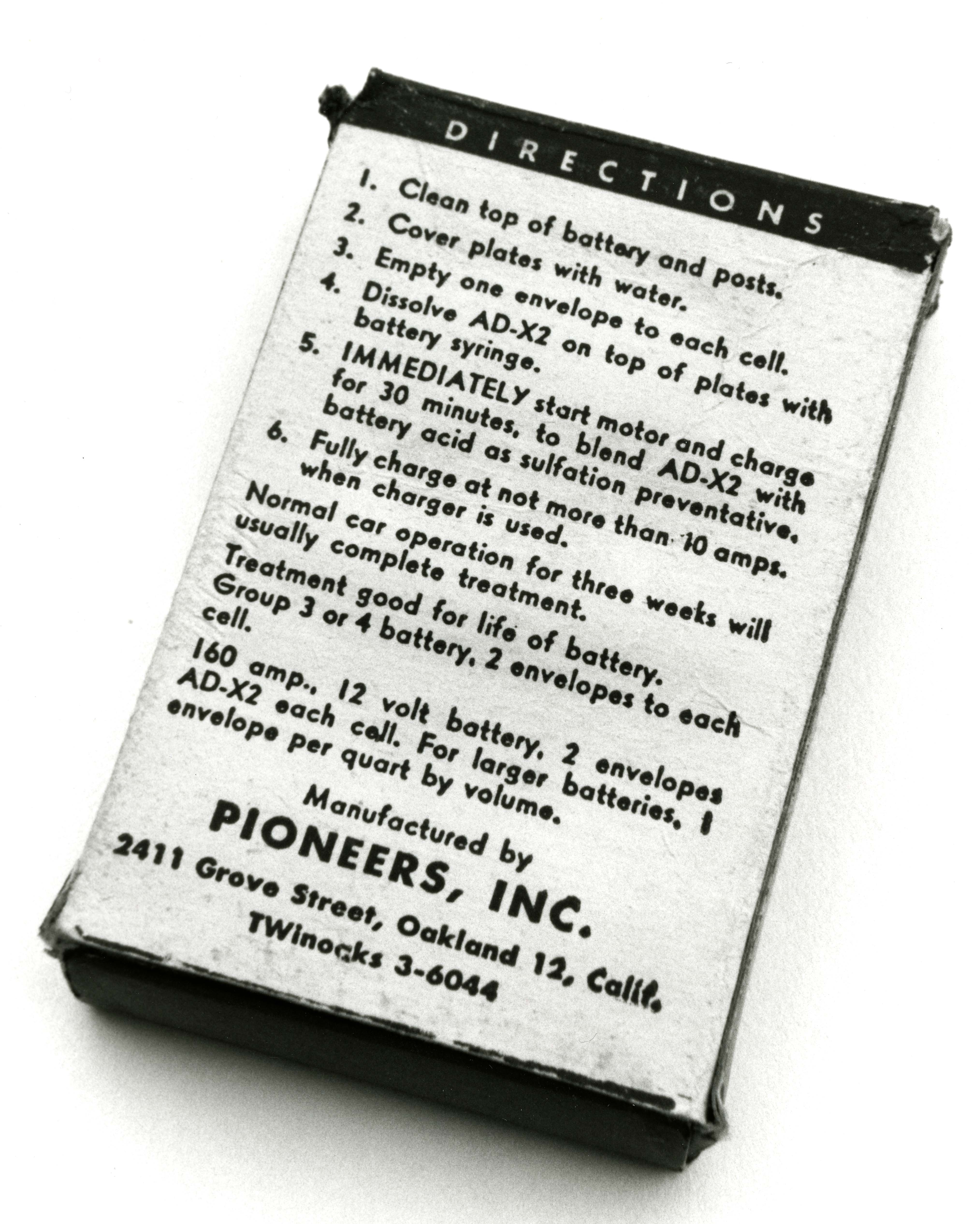
Instructions on the back of each AD-X2 package

It was found out that the reason why AD-X2 has positive testimonials is that following the directions on the package and giving the battery a long, slow charge improves the battery regardless of whether the AD-X2 is added or not.

Jess M. Ritchie died on July 2, 1965, in San Leandro, California.

On December 9, 2023, The National Institute of Standards and Technology (NIST) released a documentary entitled The AD-X2 Controversy.
