= Elham Manea =

Swiss-American academic (born 1966)

- Born: Elham Manea; 1966 (age 59–60); El Mahalla El Kubra, Egypt
- Occupations: Writer, educator
- Known for: Human rights advocacy

Elham Manea (Arabic: إلهام مانع; born 1966 in El Mahalla El Kubra, Egypt) is a Swiss-Yemeni writer, professor, and human rights advocate. She is known for her human rights advocacy, especially for her defence of women's rights, freedom of expression, freedom of/from religion, minority and LGBT rights in the Arab and Islamic world (s). She has participated in several human rights campaigns in the MENA region and is considered part of the Islamic feminist movement that insists on the possibility of gender equality in Muslim majority countries. She has led mixed prayers in London, Bern, Berlin, Cape Town and Oxford in cooperation with inclusive mosques and open mosques initiatives.

Manea is a strong critic of far right religious groups ideologies inside and outside the MENA region. She has contributed to the knowledge production on women's rights in the MENA region and women under Muslim Laws with two well received books: The Arab State and Women's Rights: The Trap of Authoritarian Governance (Routledge, 2011)The Arab State and Women's rights and Women and Sharia Law: The Impact of Legal Pluralism in the UK (I.B. Tauris, 2016).Women and Sharia Law

Manea is a regular guest in Arabic news channels and talk shows such as BBC Arabic and Al Hurra. She has been also featured as a commentator in Swiss news, radio and TV.

== Background and academic Research ==
Manea graduated from Kuwait University in 1989 with a bachelor's degree in political science and American University in 1995 with a master's degree in comparative politics. Manea is a Fulbright scholar who holds a Venia Legendi (Habilitation) and a PhD degree in political science from the University of Zurich. She was officially promoted to a titular professor in February 2023.

Manea worked as a radio and on-line journalist at Swiss Radio International (Swissinfo) until 2005. Between 2010 and 2019 she was a member of the Federal Commission for Women Affairs. In 2020 she was appointed as a member of the Federal Commission for Migration, where she serves as a vice president. Die Eidgenössische Migrationskommission EKM Manea is member of the scientific advisory board of the Austrian Documentation Center for Political Islam. In 2010

Manea is a titular professor of political science at the Political Science Institute, Zurich University. She also works as an independent consultant.

== Views on wearing the burqa ==
She has criticised the burqa as being "not-Islamic" and said that "The re-Islamisation of Saudi Arabia according to the Wahabi Salafi fundamentalist principles led to the mainstreaming of the burqa. With Gulf money you had a promotion of this ideology and a reading of Islam that turned the burqa into an 'Islamic' tradition." She called wearing it "a sign of segregation, separation, rejection of the values we see all around us — values of acceptance and tolerance and otherness."

== Bibliography ==
Manea has published academic and nonfiction books in English, German, and Arabic. Her publications include:

- Echo (2005 Saqi Books Beirut)
- Sins (2008 Saqi Books Beirut)
- The Arab State and Women's Rights: The Trap of Authoritarian Governance
- Ich will nicht Schweigen: Der Islam, Der Westen und die Menschenrechte (2009) Freiburg: Herder Verlag.
- Regional Politics of the Gulf (2005, Saqi Books)
- Women and Sharia Law: The Impact of Legal Pluralism in the UK (2016 I.B.Tauris)
- Der alltägliche Islamismus (2018, Kösel)
- The Perils of Nonviolent Islamism (Telos Press, New York, February 2021) (English Translation of Der Alltägliche Islamismus).
- Frauen und die Scharia: Die Auswirkungen des Rechtspluralismus in Großbritannien Wenn Religionsrecht mit Zivilrecht kollidiert. Mit einem Ausblick auf Deutschland, Österreich und die Schweiz (2021, Ibidem, German Translation of Women and Sharia Law)
