= Elham Tabassi =

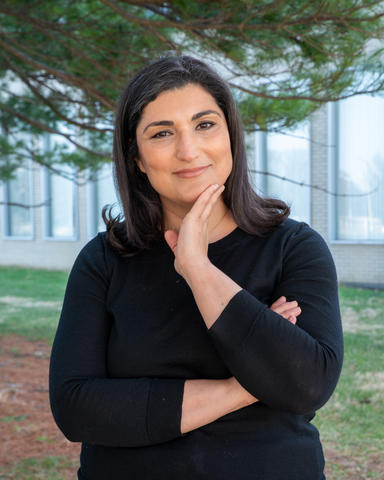
- Education: Sharif University of Technology, Santa Clara University
- Occupations: Engineer, U.S. government leader
- Organization(s): National Institute of Standards and Technology (NIST), National Artificial Intelligence (AI) Research Resource Task Force
- Honours: Time100 Most Influential People in AI
- Website: https://www.nist.gov/people/elham-tabassi

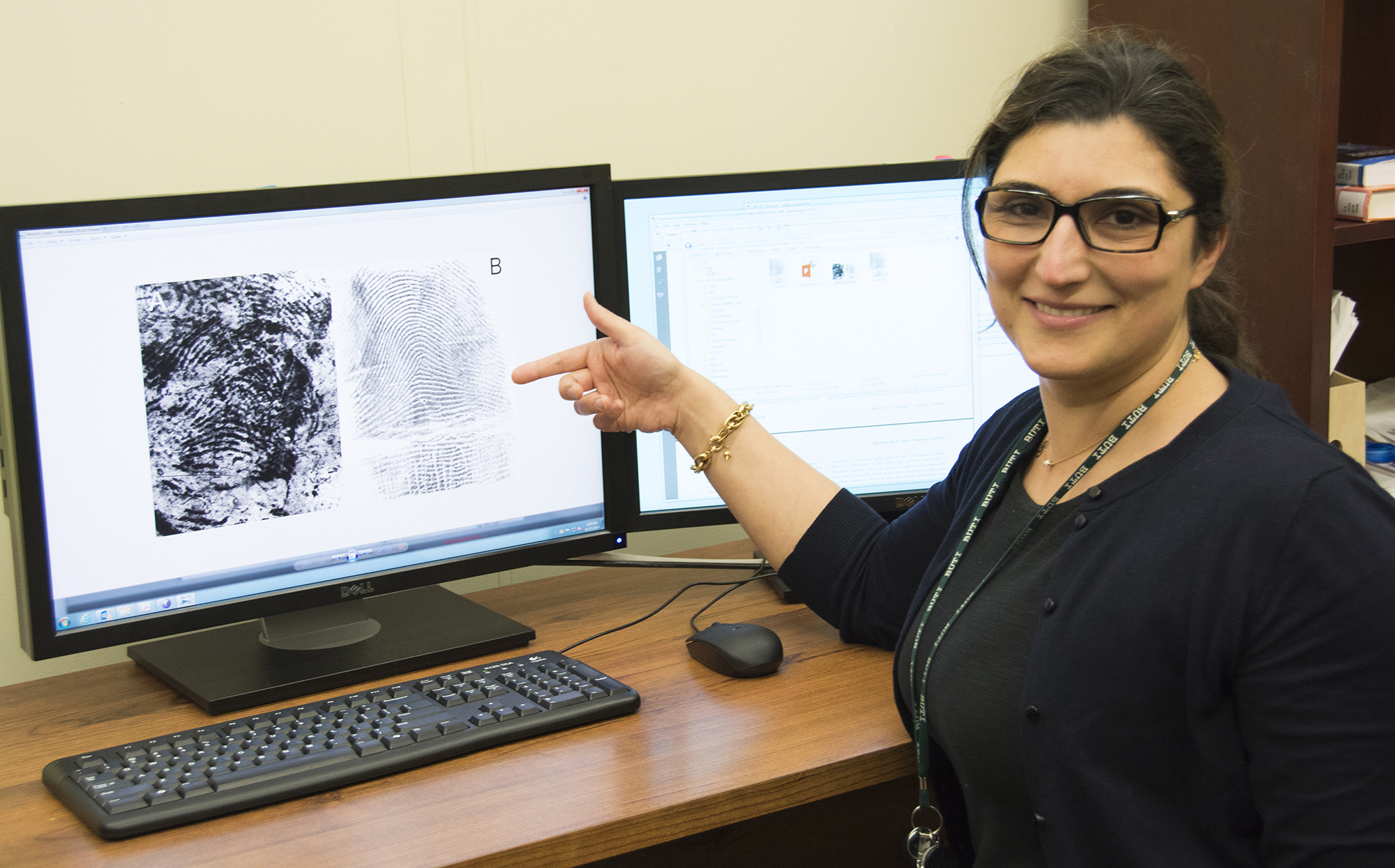
Elham Tabassi, a NIST electronics engineer, is working to develop a statistical measure of uncertainty for fingerprint decisions.

Elham Tabassi is an engineer and government leader. She was listed on the inaugural TIME100 Most Influential People in AI. Tabassi led the creation of the United States Artificial Intelligence Risk Management Framework, adopted by both industry and government. Tabassi was selected to serve on the National Artificial Intelligence (AI) Research Resource Task Force. Tabassi began her career in government at the National Institute of Standards and Technology, pioneering various machine learning and computer vision projects with applications in biometrics evaluation and standards, included in over twenty five publications. Her research has been deployed by the FBI and Department of Homeland Security.

== Early life and education ==
Inspired early in life by an aunt who studied at the Sharif University of Technology, Tabassi attended the same university and earned a degree in electrical engineering. She later attended Santa Clara University for a master's degree in electrical and electronics engineer.

== Career ==
Tabassi joined the National Institute of Standards and Technology in 1999, where she has worked on machine learning and computer vision research projects with applications in biometrics evaluation and standards. She has held roles as Electronics Engineer, Senior Research Scientist, Chief of Staff and associate director of Emerging Technologies for the Information Technology Laboratory.

She has been a member of the National AI Resource Research Task Force, Vice-chair of OECD working party on AI Governance, Associate Editor of IEEE Transaction on Information Forensics and Security, and a fellow of Washington Academy of Sciences.

The United States AI Safety Institute was created in 2024, and Tabassi was appointed as the Chief Technology Officer, responsible for leading key technical programs of the institute, focused on supporting the development and deployment of AI that is safe, secure and trustworthy.

Currently she is the director for the Brooking Artificial Intelligence and Emerging Technology Initiative. Her roles include preparing people and society for an AI future.

Tabassi leads a program through NIST about using AI responsibly. It uses AI to improve quality of life through measurement and science.

== Honors ==
- Washington Academy of Sciences, Excellence in Research in Computer Science, 2022
- Time100 Most Influential in AI, 2023
- Women in Biometrics Award, biometrics, 2016
- ANSI's Next Generation Award, biometrics, 2012
- Department of Commerce Bronze Medal, innovations in fingerprint analysis, 2007
- Department of Commerce Bronze Medal, biometrics 2010
- Department of Commerce Gold Medal, innovations in fingerprint analysis, 2003
