= Elham Kazemi =

Mathematics educator and educational psychologist

Elham Kazemi (born 1970) is a mathematics educator and educational psychologist, the Geda and Phil Condit Professor in Math and Science Education in the College of Education of the University of Washington.

== Education and career ==
Kazemi is originally from Iran, and moved to the US at age 11. She graduated from Duke University in 1992 with a bachelor's degree in psychology, and became an elementary school teacher in Phoenix, Arizona. Returning to graduate study in educational psychology at the University of California, Los Angeles, she earned a master's degree in 1997 and completed her Ph.D. in 1999. Her dissertation, Teacher Learning within Communities of Practice: Using Students’ Mathematical Thinking to Guide Teacher Inquiry, was supervised by Megan Franke.

Kazemi joined the University of Washington faculty as an assistant professor in 1999. She was named the Geda and Phil Condit Professor in 2014.

== Contributions ==
With Allison Hintz, Kazemi is the author of the book Intentional Talk: How to Structure and Lead Productive Mathematical Discussions (Stenhouse Publishers, 2014).

She has worked with the Renton School District to develop mathematics lesson in which students explain and critique their problem-solving methods with each other. Her paper with another mathematics education specialist and five Renton teachers and coaches describing her work there won the 2014 Distinguished Paper Award of the Washington Educational Research Association.
