= Asten =

Asten may refer to:

== People ==
- Charles Asten, scientist
- Leopold van Asten, Dutch equestrian

== Places ==
- Asten, Austria, municipality in Austria
- Asten, Netherlands, municipality in the Netherlands
- Kahler Asten, mountain in Germany
- River Asten in the United Kingdom
