= Elham Yaghoubian =

Iranian writer

Elham Yaghoubian (Dari: الهام یعقوبیان; born in Tehran) is a political activist, writer, and founder of Iran-Israel Alliance of Nations. She is living in the United States.

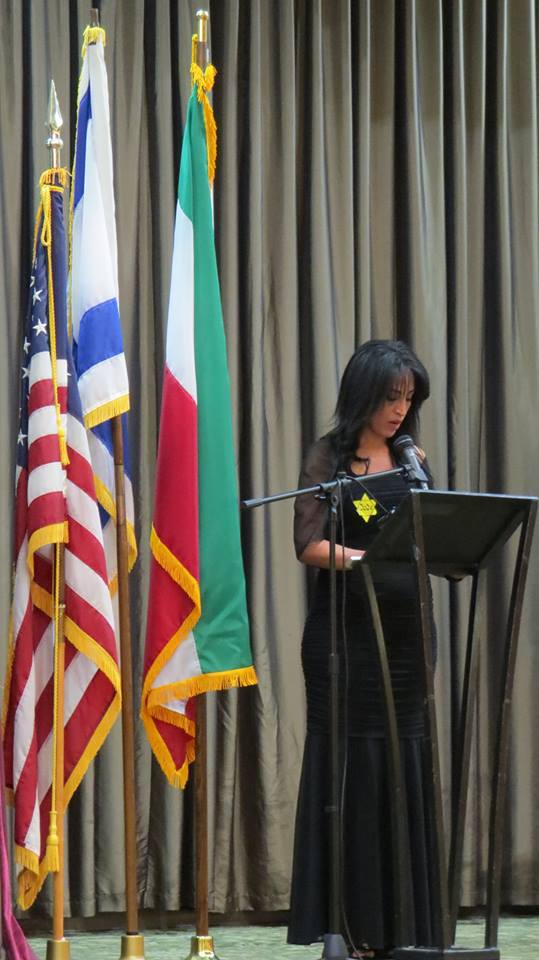
Elham Yaghoubian at Holocaust Conference 2014

== Biography ==
Elham Yaghoubian was born in Tehran, Iran. She started her Master's studies in International Relations in California State University in Los Angeles. In Iran, she received a Bachelor degree in Foreign Language Translation from Tehran Azad University in 1994. She published her second book (Tondbad e Sarnevesht e. g. Storm of Destiny) in 1996 which was republished four times. She cooperated with the Jewish journal Ofogh-e Bina as general editor and writer until her emigration to United States. Elham was a founding member and one of the head editors of Bina Magazine, e.g. ofogh bina. In 1998, Elham along with some of her nationalist peers founded the مَرز پُرگُهَر, Iranians for a secular Republic. Her third novel (Ashk-e Sham' e. g. Tear of the Candle] was published in 1999. The focus of her novels are the Persian women between tradition and modernity, the absence and maltreating of their rights predominantly by family members and lack of equivalency in social life. The novel Ašk-e šamʿ is an example of such disorder within Iranian community.

After the pro-democracy movement of July 1999, she moved to the United States. She started working as a counselor at JVS, one of the Jewish Federation's agencies helping new immigrant and refugees and continued her pro-democracy activism from the U.S. She has visited different cities and states within U.S. to give lectures, interviewed prominent human right activists and high ranking government members. Elhmam’s activities towards highlighting the human rights challenges in Iran, denial of Holocaust on behalf of Iranian leaderships and her struggle against antisemitic resentments among Iranian politicians caused harsh verbal attacks of several radical Iranian newspapers and state-financed broadcastings which identified her as Zionist and anti-revolutionary individual. In 2007, Elham started working as Community Outreach Advisor at California Army National Guard. In 2008, she pursued her studies in the masters program of the International Relations Department of California State University.

In 2008, Elham created a group on social media as Iran-Israel Alliance of Nations to promote friendship and raising awareness of the political and ancestral history of the two nations in order to promote understanding and a venue for receptive relations. Later this group was registered as a non-profit organization. Elham appeared in several News platform to talk about her mission.

In 2010, Elham announced the launch of Aryana Fashion, a new venture selling trendy handbags and accessories. Elham translated and published the Global Directory of Zorastrian Fire Temples in 2011. An open letter she wrote in 2013 addressed remarks by the Iranian comedian and actor Akbar Abdi's towards Jews during a speech he gave at a ceremony organized in his honour.

Elham continues to be a writer and activist on behalf of the Jewish Iranian diaspora in Los Angeles and nationwide.

She is board member of a few non-profit organizations such as B'nai B'rith, Iranian American Jewish Federation and also advisor of 7dorim She Is a board member of Friends of Westwood Library and Board member and CFO of West LA Chamber of Commerce

== Books ==
- The Silent Ocean (Darya ye Khamoosh)
- Storm of Destiny (Tondbad e Sarnevesht)
- The Candle's Tear (Ashk e Sham)
- Global Directory of Zoroastrian Fire Temples (co-author with Marzban J Giara)
