= Helen Astin =

Greek-American psychologist (1932–2015)

Helen "Lena" S. Astin (née Stavridou; February 6, 1932 – October 27, 2015) was an American academic who was a professor at the University of California, Los Angeles and Senior Scholar of the Higher Education Research Institute at UCLA. She is most known for her scholarly activism and research concerning higher education issues of women and minority students, as well as women’s career development. She is a recipient of the Distinguished Research Award of Division J of the American Education Research Association and received the Howard Bowen Distinguished Career Award from the Association for the Study of Higher Education.

== Career ==
In 1965 Dr. Astin accepted a position as a researcher for the Commission on Human Resources and Higher Education with the National Academy of Sciences in Washington D.C. At this post she completed a survey of 1653 of the 1979 women who received doctorates in 1957 and 1958 to gauge their productivity and involvement in the workforce. This research project lead to the publication of her first book The Woman Doctorate in America: Origins, Career, and Family.

In 1973 Dr. Astin and her husband, Alexander Astin, accepted professorships in Higher Education at UCLA where they remained until their retirement. While at UCLA Dr. Astin served as the Associate Provost of the College of Letters and Science at UCLA from 1983 to 1987, been a trustee of Mt. St. Mary's College since 1985, served as a trustee of Hampshire College from 1972 to 1979, served on the board of governors of the Center for Creative Leadership, and on the board of the National Council for Research on Women. In the American Psychological Association, Dr. Astin has served on the Boards of Policy and Planning and Education and Training and has been president of the Division of the Psychology of Women. She has also served as chair of the board of the American Association for Higher Education. Dr. Astin also co-founded the UCLA Center for the Study of Women in 1989 with fellow faculty Nancy Henley, Anne Peplau, Kathryn Sklar, and Karen Rowe and also serves as founding director of the Higher Education Research Institute at UCLA with her husband.

== Personal life ==
Helen (Lena) Astin was born Helen Stavridou on February 6, 1932 in Serres, Greece, and as a youth, witnessed World War II Greece occupation in Athens. From 1949 to 1951, she attended a teacher’s college in Salonika with a diploma in Elementary Education. After deciding to continue education abroad, Astin moved from Greece independently from her family to Long Island, New York and began school at Adelphi University in 1951, later graduating in 1953 with a B.A. in Psychology. Astin chose to pursue graduate studies at Ohio University in 1954, and in 1957, she received her PhD in Psychology from the University of Maryland.

Helen and husband Alexander (Sandy) Astin were married on February 11, 1956 after having met as peers at Maryland. Their first son, John Alexander, was born on August 28, 1959, and Paul Allen, their second son, was born on March 2, 1961. Both sons have followed in their parents footsteps and are educators, John a college professor, and Paul the founder of Manzanita School.

Helen died at her home in Los Angeles on October 27, 2015.

== Published work ==
- Astin, Helen S.; Leland, Carole (1991). Women of influence, women of vision: a cross-generational study of leaders and social change. The Jossey-Bass social and behavioral science series (1st ed.). San Francisco, Calif.: Jossey-Bass. ISBN 978-1-55542-357-5.
- Astin, Helen S. (1996). "Leadership for Social Change". About Campus: Enriching the Student Learning Experience. 1 (3): 4–10. doi:10.1002/abc.6190010302. ISSN 1086-4822.
- Bryant, Alyssa N.; Astin, Helen S. (2008). "The Correlates of Spiritual Struggle during the College Years". The Journal of Higher Education. 79 (1): 1–27. doi:10.1080/00221546.2008.11772084. ISSN 0022-1546. JSTOR 25144648.
- Astin, Alexander W.; Astin, Helen S.; Lindholm, Jennifer A. (2010). Cultivating the spirit: how college can enhance students' inner lives. San Francisco: Jossey-Bass. ISBN 978-0-470-76933-1.
