= Materials database =

A materials database is a database used to store experimental, computational, standards, or design data for materials in such a way that they can be retrieved efficiently by humans or computer programs.

== Background ==
Fast access and exchange of materials data between research, design and manufacturing teams working on different sites worldwide, is a challenging issue to be addressed during the product cycle in materials engineering. Another important issue is safeguarding high investments made into materials research, meaning that experimental data must be properly conserved, easily be located and quickly be retrieved. Materials databases (MDBs) are powerful tools to address these problems.

The development of factual materials databases began significantly in the 1980s with a leading standardization role being taken by CODATA, ASTM E49 and the British Standards i.e. BSI AMT4/-/6.

== Different types ==
Various categories of MDBs exist for different requirements, for example containing standards data on metallic alloys and plastics or more complex database applications needed for design analysis. MDBs are basic elements for establishing knowledge-based and expert systems.

=== Web enabled ===
With the emergence of the Internet, the capability of MDBs increased. Web-enabled MDBs provide a more centralized management and conservation of Materials data. Finding and accessing the required data is faster than to search for them in a traditional manner, e.g. from handbooks or Microsoft Excel files. In particular the dissemination of public research results has improved, as the data are accessible over the World Wide Web. A few web-enabled materials databases exist at present on the market.
