= Elron =

Elron may refer to:

== Surname ==
- Baruch Elron (1934–2006), Israeli painter
- Yosef Elron (b. 1955), a judge on Israel's Supreme Court
- Yoram Elron (b. 1960), an Israeli diplomat

== Other ==
- Elron (rail transit), an Estonian passenger railway company
- Elron Ventures, an Israeli technology company

== See also ==
- L. Ron (disambiguation)
