= Quash (name) =

Quash is an English surname. Notable people with the name include:

- Quamony Quash (fl. late 18th century), American freedman; co-founder of the African-American settlement Parting Ways in Plymouth, Massachusetts
- William Quash (1868–1938), English footballer
- Susanna Avery-Quash (born 1970), English art historian
