= Alan Smithers =

English educationalist

Professor Alan Smithers CPsychol FSRHE
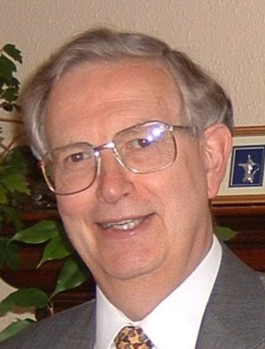
- Professor Smithers
- Born: 20 May 1938 (age 88); East End of London
- Known for: Educational research, writing and broadcasting
- Spouse(s): Angela Wykes (divorced, 2003)
- Children: 2 daughters

Academic background
- Education: King's College London (BSc, PhD); University of Bradford (MSc, PhD); University of Manchester (MEd)

Academic work
- Discipline: Education
- Institutions: College of St Mark and St John in Chelsea, London

Alan George Smithers (born 20 May 1938) is an English academic psychologist and public policy advisor best known for his research and publications in the field of education.

== Early life ==
Smithers was born in the East End of London, the son of a Billingsgate fish porter. His mother worked in a sweet factory, and he claims he lived on fish and Turkish delight during the war. He was educated at Barking Abbey Grammar School then King's College London, gaining a first class honours degree BSc and a PhD in plant physiology in 1966. He later gained an MSc in the psychology and sociology of education and a PhD in education in 1974 from the University of Bradford. Since all professors at the University of Manchester, where Smithers taught, are required to be graduates of the university, an MEd was conferred on him in 1981. He became a Chartered Psychologist in 1988.

== Career ==
=== Plant physiology ===
He was originally a research scientist in plant physiology. From 1962 to 1964 he lectured in biology at the College of St Mark and St John in Chelsea, then botany at Birkbeck College from 1964 to 1967.

=== Education ===
He became involved in education as a subject when, in the 1960s, the University of London, where he lectured, began introducing modular degrees. This led to a secondment at the newly elevated University of Bradford. There he re-qualified as a psychologist before becoming Senior Lecturer in Education in 1969. He became a professor at the University of Manchester at the age of 37. He has successively occupied four chairs: Professor of Education at the University of Manchester (1976–96); Professor of Policy Research at Brunel University (1996-8); Sydney Jones Professor of Education at the University of Liverpool (1998–2004); and currently as Director of the Centre for Education and Employment Research at the University of Buckingham (2004 to present). He was elected as one of the first three fellows of the Society for Research in Higher Education in 1986. He was seconded to BP from September 1991 to August 1992 to help it think more systematically about the value of its education programmes.

== Educational research ==
Areas with which Smithers has been associated include choice and selection in education, social variation between schools, qualifications and assessment, physics education, international comparisons of educational achievement, headship, teacher training, recruitment and retention, technical and further education, the independent/state divide, single-sex and coeducation, and higher education.

== Publications ==
Selected publications, in addition to The Good Teacher Training Guide which has been published annually since 1998 include:

- GCSE Prospects: Restoring the Value? (2023)
- A-Level Prospects: Return to Normal? (2023)
- Where Next for Apprenticeships 2016 (2016)
- Social Disadvantage and Widening Access to Universities (2015)
- HEFCEs Blunder (2015)
- The Science and Mathematics Teaching Workforce (2014)
- Confusion in the Ranks (2013)
- 14-18 A New Vision for Secondary Education (2013)
- Educating the Highly Able (2012)
- Choice and Selection in Education: the experience of other countries (2010)
- Worlds Apart: social variation among schools (2010)
- Physics Participation and Policies: lessons from abroad (2009)
- Specialist Science Schools (2009)
- The Diploma: a disaster waiting to happen? (2008)
- Blair's Education: an international perspective (2007)
- Physics in Schools and Colleges (2007)
- School Headship (2007)
- The Paradox of Single Sex and Coeducational Schooling (2006)
- England’s Education (2004)
- Attracting Teachers (2000)
- Further Education Reformed (2000)
- The Impact of Double Science (1994)
- General Studies (1993)
- Graduates in the Police Service (1990)
- Increasing Participation in Higher Education (1989)
- The Growth of Mixed A-Levels (1988)
- The Progress of Mature Students (1986)
- Sandwich Courses: an Integrated Education? (1976).

Two of his reports were featured as Dispatches programmes on Channel 4, Every Child in Britain (1991) and All Our Futures: Britain’s Education Revolution (1993). He has been a frequent commentator on the policies of successive governments. His analyses of Blair's education have appeared in Anthony Seldon's books, The Blair Effect: The Blair Government 1997-2001 (2001), The Blair Effect 2001-2005 (2005) and Blair's Britain 1997-2007 (2007). He has also reviewed in Seldon's books the impact of the Coalition and Conservative administrations: The Coalition Effect 2010-2015 (2015) and The Conservative Effect 2010-2024: 14 Wasted Years? (2024).

== Educational advisor at a national level ==
Smithers has served as an adviser, latterly standing adviser, to the Commons Education Select Committee since 1997. He claims to be apolitical, believing that close association with any one party compromises the objectivity of the research. He has served on national committees including the National Curriculum Council, the Beaumont Review of National Vocational Qualifications and the Royal Society Committee on Teacher Supply.

== Personal life ==
He married Angela Wykes in 1962, with whom he had two daughters; they divorced in 2003.
