= Joel Lion =

Israeli diplomat

Joel Lion יואל ליאון
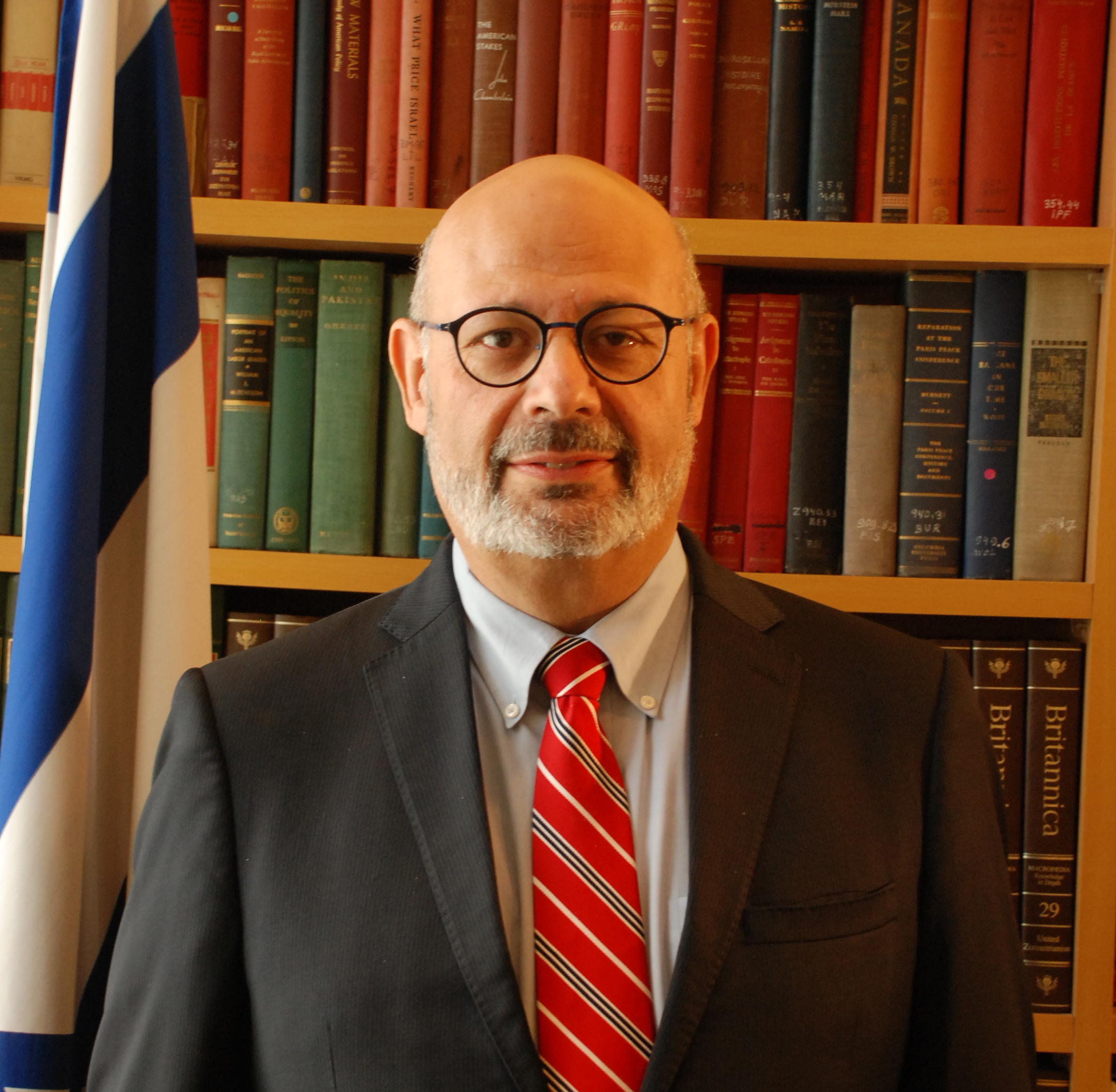
- Born: 16 January 1964 (age 62); France
- Citizenship: Israeli
- Education: The Hebrew University (BA) University of Latvia (MA) Ariel University (PhD)
- Occupation: Diplomat

Ambassador of the State of Israel to Ukraine
- In office August 2018 – August 2021
- President: Reuven Rivlin
- Preceded by: Eliav Belotserkovskiy
- Succeeded by: Michael Brodsky

Ambassador of the State of Israel to the Republic of Moldova
- In office April 2022 – April 2025
- President: Isaac Herzog
- Preceded by: Eliav Belotserkovskiy
- Succeeded by: Yoram Elron

Ambassador of the State of Israel to the Republic of Armenia
- In office April 2022 – 14 August 2026
- President: Isaac Herzog
- Preceded by: Eliav Belotserkovskiy

Joel Lion (Hebrew: יואל ליאון; born 1964) is an Israeli diplomat. A senior member of the Israeli Ministry of Foreign Affairs since 1993, he has served in various positions in Israel and abroad, and has served as chargé d’affaires in Turkey since September 2026.

== Early life and education ==
Lion was born in France and raised in Esch-sur-Alzette in Luxembourg. He attended a Yeshiva high school in Switzerland before immigrating to Israel in 1982 through the Bnei Akiva “Hachshara” program. Staff-Sergeant in the Artillery Corps of the Israeli Defence Force, he holds a Bachelor’s degree in Political Science from the Hebrew University of Jerusalem, a Master’s in History from the University of Latvia, and a PhD in Jewish Heritage from Ariel University. He was also ordained as a Rabbi.

== Diplomatic career ==
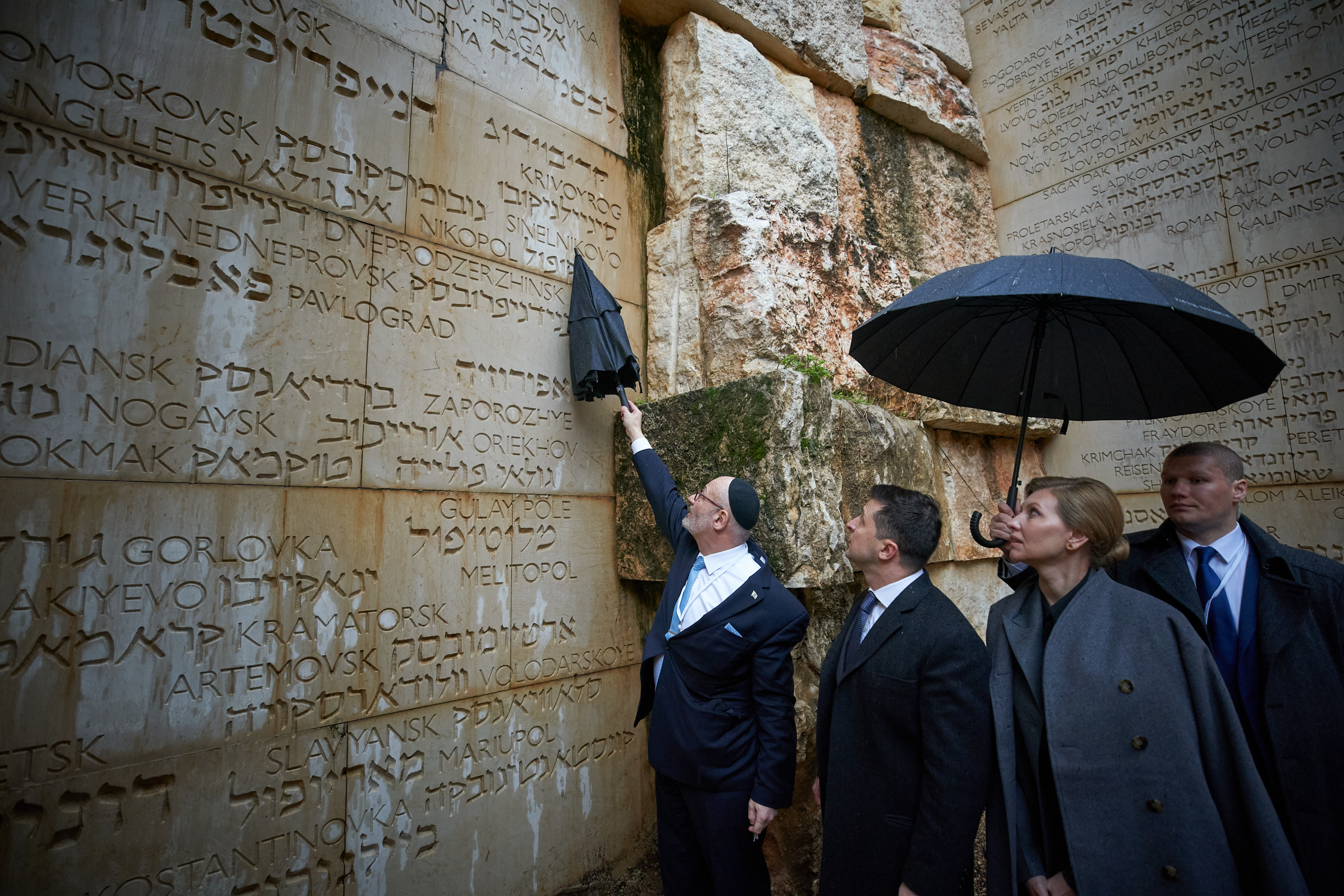
Lion guides Ukrainian President Volodymyr Zelenskyy and his wife on a visit to the Valley of the Communities at Yad Vashem, as part of the President's visit to Israel for the Fifth World Holocaust Forum, January 2020

Lion joined the Israeli Ministry of Foreign Affairs in 1993. His early career included diplomatic roles as Deputy Chief of Mission for Latvia, Estonia, and Lithuania in Riga, and as Chargé d'Affaires for Slovakia in Vienna. He later served in Berlin as Counselor and Head of the Public Affairs Department, and in Jerusalem as Deputy Director for the Western European Department, managing political relations with Germany.

Between August 2009 to August 2011, Lion was Spokesperson and Consul for Media Affairs at the Consulate General of Israel in New York. He then served as Consul General of Israel in Montreal and Permanent Representative to the International Civil Aviation Organization (ICAO) from August 2011 to August 2014.

Upon returning to Jerusalem, he held several positions, including Director of the Public and Academic Affairs Department, Special Envoy for Holocaust Issues and the Return of Jewish Property, and Chief of Diplomatic Staff to Deputy Minister of Foreign Affairs Tzipi Hotovely.

Lion was appointed Ambassador to Ukraine in August 2018, serving until 2021. In April 2022, he became non-resident Ambassador to Armenia and Moldova. Following the opening of the Israeli embassy in Chișinău in December 2024, he became Israel's first resident ambassador to Moldova. He concluded his posting to Moldova in April 2025 and his mandate to Armenia in August 2026.

In September 2026, he has been appointed chargé d’affaires in Turkey.

== Notable Achievements ==
Lion directed the creation and international presentation of Open a Door to Israel, a multimedia exhibition about Israeli culture. The exhibition was presented in France, Italy, Russia, India, Singapore, Japan, South Korea, and the United States.

As Special Envoy for Holocaust Restitution, Lion worked with the World Jewish Restitution Organization (WJRO), on Holocaust restitution issues and was involved in efforts that led to a 2017 joint declaration by Members of the European Parliament on Holocaust-era property claims and restitution. He oversaw the opening of the Israeli embassy in Chișinău in 2024 and headed Israel's emergency response team in Moldova during the Russian invasion of Ukraine, which dealt with the Ukrainian refugee crisis.

== Special Missions ==
In 1999, Lion became the first Israeli official to participate in an election-monitoring mission with the Organization for Security and Cooperation in Europe. During the second Intifada, he served as a spokesman for a Ministry of Foreign Affairs (MFA) special team in Bethlehem in 2001. During Operation Cast Lead, he served as director of the Ministry of Foreign Affairs Press Center in Sderot.

During the first months of Iron Swords War, he served as Deputy Spokesperson for the MFA.

== Personal life ==
Lion is married to Rivka Ende, a father of eight and grandfather of nine. He also volunteers as an EMT with United Hatzalah.

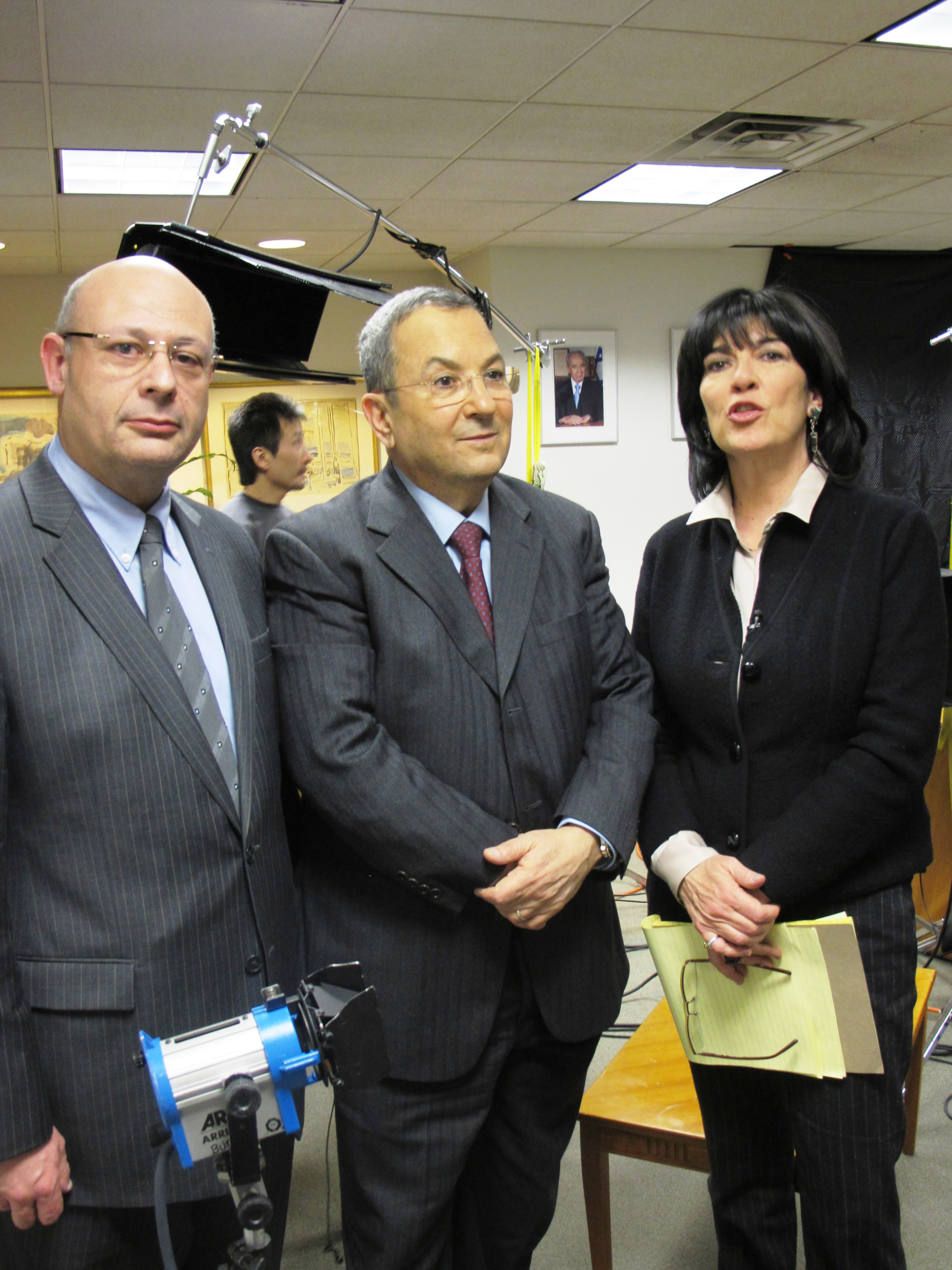
Joel Lion, Israel's Minister of Defense Ehud Barak and ABC Reporter Christiane Amanpur

== Selected publications ==
- The Trees Sing: A Sourcebook for Tu Bi-Shevat, selected by Rabbi Moshe Edelman and edited by Joel Lion, Jewish National Fund, 1992
- "What is really on trial in the Goldstone Report", Jewish Telegraphic Agency, October 18, 2009
- "Residents of Jerusalem", letter to the editor, The New York Times, December 4, 2010
- "Israel and the Gaza Flotilla", letter to the editor, The New York Times, June 3, 2011
- "Lessons for the Middle East from the Festival of Lights", National Post, December 23, 2011
- "Hamas violence forcing Israel to defend itself", The Gazette, November 21, 2012
- "Palestinian unilateralism will solve nothing", National Post, November 29, 2012
