= E. G. West Centre =

Institution at Newcastle University, UK

- Type: Institution
- Established: 2002
- Director: James Tooley
- Location: Newcastle upon Tyne, Tyne & Wear, England
- Affiliations: Newcastle University

The E. G. West Centre is an institution at Newcastle University which advocates choice, competition and entrepreneurship in education. They perform research into private schooling in some of the world's poorest economies. It is currently directed by James Tooley. Other notable people at the centre include Pauline Dixon and Sugata Mitra.

== See also ==
- James Tooley
- Pauline Dixon
- Sugata Mitra
- E. G. West
