= Baruch Elron =

Israeli painter (1934-2006)

Baruch Elron ברוך אלרון
- Born: Barbu Teodorescu; 1934; Bucharest, Romania
- Died: 2006 (aged 71–72); Tel Aviv, Israel
- Known for: Painting
- Movement: Israeli art, Fantastic Realism, Mandy Sand
- Awards: Israel Jubilee Prize

Baruch Elron (Hebrew: ברוך אלרון) or Barbu Teodorescu (1934–2006) was an Israeli painter best known for his unique Fantastic Realist style rich in symbols and allegories.

== Early life and studies ==
Baruch Elron (Barbu Teodorescu) was born in Bucharest, in a family of Sephardic Jews.

Baruch Elron studied Painting at the Nicolae Grigorescu Fine Arts Academy in Bucharest. Among his teachers were Corneliu Baba, Alexandru Ciucurencu, Jean Alexandru Steriadi and Yosef Molnar.

During his student years, Elron made several study trips to Moscow, Prague and Budapest where he spent his time in the museums, studying the great masters.

In 1958, he was granted the Excellency Award at the International Art Fair of Rio de Janeiro, Brazil. A year later, in Moscow, he received the prize of the Moscow Youth Festival.

After graduating from the academy, he began to work as a graphic artist, as a book illustrator and in advertising.

In 1960, he received the Prize for Book Illustration at the Dresden Book Fair in Germany.

== Life in Israel ==
In 1961, Baruch Elron married Lydia Elron. Two years later, the couple and their families immigrated to Israel. Upon leaving Romania, Elron was prohibited by the Romanian Communist authorities from taking his artwork with him, resulting in the loss of all his early works, which remained in Romania.

Elron's early years in Israel were marked by personal and national challenges, including the birth of his first child and his participation in three subsequent wars. He worked initially in advertising and later in the police reconstitution department. Eventually, Elron chose to fully dedicate himself to painting, considering it his sole professional pursuit.

== Exhibitions and awards ==
In 1966, Elron had his first solo exhibition in Tel Aviv, closely followed by many others: New York City (1967), Montreal and Toronto (1969).

Between 1974 and 1976, he took part at the International Art Fair of Düsseldorf and Cologne, in Germany. In the following years, he had solo exhibitions in almost all the biggest cities of Germany and in museums such as The Solingen Art Museum and Gustav Lubke Museum.

He also exhibited in France, Austria, Quadrienale di Roma Italy, Belgium, Croatia, Abidjan, Romania], the United States and Israel, among other countries.

In 1997, he received the ACMEOR Prize for Plastic Arts and in 1998 Baruch Elron was granted the Israel Jubilee Award, for artistic and cultural achievements.

In 2000, he was offered the Special recognition award by the Iancolovici Foundation, in Haifa.

== Teaching and other activities ==
Between 1985 and 1994, Elron was the Chairman of the Union of Artists of Israel. He also taught painting at the Herzliya Art Museum, the Warrior's House (where he used painting in order to psychologically treat Israel's wounded soldiers) and at the Popular University.

In 2006, Elron died in Tel Aviv, leaving behind many unfinished works.

== Posthumous recognition ==
Retrospective exhibitions took place in Israel, Monaco, France, Romania.

In 2011 and 2012, several works by Elron were displayed at the International collective exhibitions “The Spirit of Art” in London and “Lights in Winter” (The Archeological Museum of Jaffa, Israel) and “Israel’s Gems”, in the U.K.

In 2011, Baruch Elron's painting “Exodus” appeared on the cover of the book “Maranatha”, Niram Art Publishing House, Madrid.

In December 2011, the Third Edition of the Niram Art Cultural Awards, offered in Madrid by the Niram Art Publishing House and Art Magazine honored Elron's life and art.

== Art style ==
In her book The Magical World of Baruch Elron, art historian Miriam Or said:

The school called Fantastic Realism with which Elron is identified, was created in Vienna after the Second World War... Elron links the subjects of his works to expressions based in literature, poetry, drama, sayings, maxims, fables and philosophical ideas taken from different humanistic cultures. His own fantastic approach is based on and echoes medieval art, the 19th-century symbolists, 20th-century Surrealist art, Viennese Fantastic Realism, in addition to the Humanist and Virtual art of the late 20th and the beginning of the 21st century.

== Themes ==
In the book Baruch Elron, the Spanish art critique Héctor Martínez Sanz identifies several major topics to which Elron returns in different periods of creation: time, the egg seen as the beginning of life, music, the metaphor of the window, nature both fantastic as well as Israeli landscapes, and Jewish themes such as Bible’s stories, all infused with a richness of imagination, symbols, allegories, similes which bring together the conscious and the unconscious worlds.

The series “Bible’s Stories” originated, as Elron himself acknowledged in the Passover Hagaddah: “In each and every generation, a person is obligated to regard himself as though he actually left Egypt. As it says: "You shall tell your son on that day, 'It is because of this that God took me out of Egypt.'" (Exodus 13:8) Héctor Martínez Sanz observed that “Elron’s choices of selection of the Biblical episodes is by no means casual. The universality of these reveal Elron’s intention to reach towards the whole public, without restrictions.” The painting “Exodus” is symbolic for the entire series, Elron mixes elements from the past and the present creating a modern image of the biblical heroes. “Elron submerges in our nowadays the traditionally highlighted Biblical episodes by means of an imaginative free association of elements that fusion the distant past with the present time in a natural way, without any type of compelling awkwardness.”

Other themes tackled in his vast art creation are the symbolism of the bird, the portrait, light and shadow and the myth of creation, the four elements of nature, metamorphosis, etc.

== Selected artwork ==
The painting "Sharp Pain" by Elron was selected by the EFIC (Europe against pain). The painting was selected from among 250 submissions at a competition jointly sponsored by the Israeli pharmaceutical company Rafa Laboratories Ltd. and the Israel Pain Association at its annual meeting in Haifa 11/2000. The piece has become well known amongst researchers, physicians and other caregivers in the field of pain as well as the public at large since it was selected by the European Federation of IASP Chapters (EFIC) as a central illustration for the 1st European Week Against Pain (Oct. 8-13, 2001), to express the idea: "Don't Suffer in Silence". The painting also graces the home page of EFIC's web site and serves as a banner for EFIC's overall initiative "Europe Against Pain".

At the 10th anniversary of EWAP, they re-used Elron's picture "Don't suffer in silence" for the EWAP logo/initiatives of 2010.

== Books ==
- “The Magical World of Baruch Elron”, by Miriam Or, Israel, 2004
- "Baruch Elron”, by Héctor Martínez Sanz, Niram Art Editorial, Spain, 2012
- "Malerei der Gegenwart" by Gustav René Hocke, Limes, 1975 (Painting of the Present Day: Neomannerism From Surrealism to Meditation)
- Lexikon der phantastischen Künstler by Gerhard Habarta (mention)
