= E. G. West =

British economic historian

Edwin George West (27 February 1922 – 6 October 2001) was an economist and economic historian at Carleton University interested in the relationship between the state and the education sector. He applied public choice theory to state education and "he had a profound influence on both academic scholarship and education policy in Britain and abroad". The E.G. West Centre at Newcastle University is named in his honor.

West grew up in Exeter and graduated with a degree in economics from University College, Exeter in 1948. He then spent three years as a schoolteacher in Staffordshire, before becoming a lecturer at Guildford College of Technology (1951) and Oxford College of Technology (1956). In 1962 he was hired by Stan Dennison for the Economics faculty at Newcastle University.

His book, Education and the State, published in 1965, continues to be highly influential. He researched how the state gradually became more and more involved in the education system of England and other countries. He examined the effect it had on the quality of education, concluding that its influence was ultimately negative.

West was visiting professor at the University of California at Berkeley (1974), Emory University (1985-1988), the University of Western Australia (1995) and the University of Kentucky (1995).

== Selected books ==
- Adam Smith into the Twentieth Century. Brookfield, VT: Elgar, 1996.
- Higher Education and Competitiveness. Kingston, Ont.: Queen's University, 1993.
- Higher Education in Canada. Vancouver, BC: Fraser Institute, 1988.
- Ending the Squeeze on Universities. Montreal, Que: Institute for Research on Public Policy, 1983 (co-author)
- Minimum Wages. Ottawa, Ont: Economic council of Canada, 1980 (co-author).
- Nonpublic School Aid. Lexington, MA: Lexington Books, 1976.
- Adam Smith. New Rochelle, NY: Barnes & Noble, 1975.
- Education and the Industrial Revolution. Liberty Fund, 1975.
- Economics, Education and the Politician. London: Institute of Economic Affairs, 1968.
- Education and the State,. Liberty Fund, 1965.

== Selected chapters ==
- Public Education and Imperfect Democracy in Machan, Tibor R. (Ed.) Education in a Free Society, 2000.
- Supplying and Financing Education in Giersch, Herbert (Ed.) Springer, 1998.
- The Economics of Higher Education in The Academy in Crisis, Independent Institute, 1995.
- The Public Monopoly and the Seeds of Self-Destruction in Family Choice in Schooling, Manley-Casimir, 1982.
- The Economics of Compulsion in The Twelve Year Sentence, 1974.
- Parental Choice in Education in Rebirth of Britain, Institute of Economic Affairs, 1964.

== See also ==
- James Tooley
- The E. G. West Centre
