= Lloyd Clark =

Military historian and scholar

Professor Lloyd Clark FRHS (born 1967) is co-founder of the Centre for Army Leadership based at the Royal Military Academy Sandhurst, and is professorial research fellow in the Humanities Research Institute of the University of Buckingham. As a professor, he teaches Modern War Studies and Contemporary Military History.

== Selected publications ==
- A History of the First World War (Hutchinson, 2002)
- The Orne Bridgehead (Sutton, 2004)
- Operation Epsom (Sutton, 2004)
- Operation Market Garden – September 1944 (Sutton, 2004)
- Anzio – The Friction of War – Italy and the Battle for Rome 1944 (UK: Headline, 2006; US: Grove Atlantic, 2006)
- Arnhem – Jumping the Rhine 1944-45 (UK: Headline, 2008; US: Grove Atlantic, 2008)
- Kursk – The Greatest Battle – Eastern Front 1943 (UK: Headline, 2011; US: Grove Atlantic, 2011)
- Blitzkrieg: Myth, Reality, and Hitler’s Lightning War: France 1940 (UK: Atlantic, 2016; US: Grove Atlantic, 2016).
- The Commanders: The Leadership Journey's of Bernard Montgomery, George Patton and Erwin Rommel (UK: Atlantic, 2022; US Grove Atlantic, 2022)
