= Anthony Seldon =

British educator and historian (born 1953)

Sir Anthony Seldon FRSA FRHistS FKC
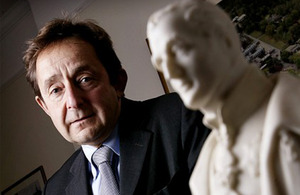
- Born: Anthony Francis Seldon; 2 August 1953 (age 73); Stepney, London, England
- Education: Worcester College, Oxford (BA); London School of Economics (PhD); Polytechnic of Central London (MBA); King's College London (PGCE)
- Occupations: Headmaster; contemporary historian; commentator; political author
- Known for: Master of Epsom College; Former master of Wellington College; Former vice-chancellor of the University of Buckingham
- Spouses: Joanna Pappworth (m. 1982; died 2016) Sarah Sayer (m. 2022)
- Children: 3
- Father: Arthur Seldon

Sir Anthony Francis Seldon (born 2 August 1953) is a British contemporary historian and educator. As an author, he is known for his political biographies of consecutive British Prime Ministers, John Major, Tony Blair, Gordon Brown, David Cameron, Theresa May, Boris Johnson, Liz Truss and Rishi Sunak, and as an educator, the Master of Wellington College, in Berkshire. Seldon is the author or editor of more than 50 books on contemporary history, politics, and education.

He has been headmaster of independent schools Wellington College, Epsom College and Brighton College. In 2009, he set up The Wellington Academy, the first state school to carry the name of its founding independent school. He was vice-chancellor of the University of Buckingham from 2015 to 2020, when he was succeeded by James Tooley. In 2024, he returned to Wellington College as the Founding Director of Wellington College Education, and is the devisor of AI in Education, the Museum of the Prime Minister and the Western Front Way.

He was the co-founder and first director of the Institute for Contemporary British History, is the co-founder of Action for Happiness, is a governor of the Royal Shakespeare Company, was the Founding Chair of the National Archives Trust and is on the boards of a number of charities and educational bodies.

He is honorary historical adviser to 10 Downing Street and was a member of the First World War Centenary Culture Committee. Seldon was knighted in the 2014 Birthday Honours for services to education and modern political history.

== Early life and education ==
Seldon was born in Stepney, the youngest son of economist Arthur Seldon (born Abraham Margolis), who helped develop the Institute of Economic Affairs and directed academic affairs at the think tank for 30 years. His father was the child of Jewish immigrants who fled antisemitic pogroms in Russia.

Seldon was educated first at Dulwich College Preparatory School, and Bickley Park School, and then Tonbridge School, followed by Worcester College, Oxford, where he took a BA in PPE. In 1981, he gained a PhD in Economics at the London School of Economics. He has an MBA from the Polytechnic of Central London. He obtained a PGCE from King's College London.

== Career ==
Seldon's first teaching appointment was at Whitgift School in Croydon in 1983; he became head of Politics. In 1989 he returned to his old school, Tonbridge, and became head of History and General Studies. In 1993 he was appointed deputy headmaster and, ultimately, acting headmaster of St. Dunstan's College in London. He then became headmaster of Brighton College from September 1997 until he joined Wellington College in January 2006 as its 13th Master. He became executive principal at The Wellington Academy (a separate school) in 2013.

He took a three-month sabbatical from January to March 2014 (leaving Wellington to be run in the interim by his second master, Robin Dyer, who as acting master, stated it would be "business as usual"). Seldon announced on 23 April 2014 that he would be leaving Wellington College in the summer of 2015, after nearly ten years as the 13th master.

In September 2015, he replaced Terence Kealey as vice-chancellor of the University of Buckingham, the first private university in Britain.

In March 2023, he replaced Emma Pattison as head master of Epsom College, following her murder. In September 2024 he returned to Wellington College as the Founding Director of Wellington College Education to lead its development and evolution of global education, and to "shape and refine what education should mean in the mid-21st century."

== History, politics and other writing ==
Seldon's books include:

- Churchill's Indian Summer (1981), which won a Best First Work Prize
- Major, A Political Life (1997)
- The Powers Behind the Prime Minister (1999) with Professor Dennis Kavanagh
- 10 Downing Street: The Illustrated History (2000)
- The Foreign Office: The Illustrated History Of The Place And Its People (2001)
- Blair (2004)
- Blair Unbound (2007)
- Trust (2009)
- Brown at 10 (2010) with Guy Lodge
- Public Schools and The Great War (2013) with David Walsh
- The Architecture of Diplomacy: The British Ambassador's Residence in Washington (2014) with Daniel Collings
- Cameron at 10 (2015) with Peter Snowdon
- May at 10 (2020) with Raymond Newell
- Johnson at 10 (2024) with Raymond Newell
- Truss at 10: How Not to Be Prime Minister (2024) with Jonathan Meakin
- The Path for Peace: Walking the Western Front Way (2023)
- The Impossible Office: The History of the British Prime Minister (2024) with Jonathan Meakin, Illias Thoms and Tom Egerton
- The Path for Light: Walking to Auschwitz (2025)
- Sunak at 10: The Last Conservative Prime Minister? (2026) with Tom Egerton
- Britain's Greatest Education Opportunity Ever: Why our approach to AI is stuck in the starting blocks; and how to get out with Tim Bunting (2026)

He has edited many books, including the series The Thatcher Effect (1989):

- The Major Effect (1994);
- The Blair Effect (2001)
- The Blair Effect 2001–2005 (2005)
- Blair's Britain (2007)
- The Coalition Effect (2015) with Dr Mike Finn
- The Conservative Effect (2024) with Tom Egerton
- The Brexit Effect (2026)
- The Fourth Education Revolution with Oladimeji Abidoye; Buckingham University Press, 2018
- Public Schools and the Second World War, with David Walsh, Pen & Sword, 2020
- Other edited books include:
  - Ruling Performance, with Professor Peter Hennessy and Conservative Century, with Professor Stuart Ball.
  - He has written a number of booklets on education, including Private and Public Education: The Divide Must End (2000)
  - Partnership not Paternalism (2001); An End To Factory Schools (2010);
  - The Politics of Optimism (2012); and School United (2014). His 2011 Cass Lecture was published as 'Why Schools? Why Universities?'
- He also founded two journals:
  - Contemporary Record in 1987, renamed in 1996 as Contemporary British History
  - and Twentieth Century British History in 1990, renamed Modern British History in 2024.

During his time at Brighton College, Seldon wrote Brave New City: Brighton & Hove Past, Present, Future, an analysis of the city of Brighton and Hove focused principally on its buildings.

== Work in education ==
Seldon is a headteacher and appears on television and radio and in the press, and has written regularly for national newspapers including The Times, The Sunday Times, The Daily Telegraph, The Independent and The Guardian. His views on education have been sought by the government and political parties, with Seldon promoting co-education, the International Baccalaureate, independent education, the teaching of happiness and well-being, and "all-round" education.

Seldon has promoted well-being or happiness classes, which he introduced at Wellington College in 2006, and campaigned for a holistic, personalised approach to education rather than what he calls "factory schools". He is a proponent of the Harkness table teaching approach used in the US and the 'Middle Years' approach of the IB, as well a more international approach to education, including a focus on modern languages teaching and setting up sister schools in China. On Friday 17 February 2023, he was announced as the interim head of Epsom College, beginning in March 2023, following the death of the previous head, Emma Pattison. He is now back at Wellington College as the Founding Director of Wellington College Education, working with the OECD to adapt the existing education model to reflect the changing needs of our increasingly digital world by implementing the OECD's framework for Human Flourishing in the Age of AI.

== Achievements and awards ==
Seldon has honorary doctorates or fellowships from the University of Buckingham, the University of Brighton and Richmond University and is a former professor of Education at the College of Teachers. He is a fellow of the Royal Historical Society (FRHistS) and of the Royal Society of Arts (FRSA). He was appointed a fellow of King's College London (FKC) in 2013. He was knighted in the Queen's 2014 Birthday Honours list, and in 2016 he received an Honorary Doctorate from the University of Bath.

== Other work ==
In 1986 Seldon co-founded, with Professor Peter Hennessy, the Institute of Contemporary British History, a body whose aim is to promote research into, and the study of, British history since 1945. Seldon is a co-founder of Action for Happiness with Richard Layard (Baron Layard), and Geoff Mulgan. He is also a patron of The Iris Project, which runs literacy schemes through Latin in schools in deprived urban areas and of DrugFAM, which supports families affected by a loved one's abuse of drugs or alcohol.

He was a board member of the Royal Shakespeare Company and was executive producer of the 2017 film version of Journey's End. He was the deputy chair and instigator of the Times Education Commission and of the Institute of Government to Commission on the Centre, former chair of the Comment Awards, president of the International Positive Education Network (IPEN), chair of the National Archives Trust and he was the originator of the Via Sacra/Western Front Way Walk.

== Television and radio ==
Among his television work, he has presented In Search of Tony Blair (Channel 4, 2004) and Trust Politics (BBC Two, 2010).

== Family ==
Seldon was married to Joanna Pappworth, who died from endocrine cancer in December 2016. Joanna was the daughter of medical ethicist Maurice Henry Pappworth. Anthony and Joanna met at Oxford, married in 1982, and had three children: Jessica, Susannah, and Adam. In 2022 he married Sarah Sayer; she had been a language teacher at Wellington College.

Academic offices
Preceded by Terence Kealey	Vice-Chancellor of the University of Buckingham; 2015–2020	Succeeded by James Tooley
