= University of Buckingham =

Private university in Buckinghamshire, England

- Motto: Latin: Alis Volans Propriis
- Motto in English: Flying on Our Own Wings
- Type: Private
- Established: 1973; as university college 1983; as university
- Chancellor: Dame Mary Archer
- Vice-Chancellor: Vacant
- Academic staff: 97 (2011)
- Administrative staff: 103 (2011)
- Students: 3,455 (2024/25)
- Undergraduates: 1,810 (2024/25)
- Postgraduates: 1,645 (2024/25)
- Location: Buckingham, England; 51°59′45″N 0°59′31″W
- Campus: Multiple sites, rural
- Colours: Charcoal and gold
- Website: buckingham.ac.uk
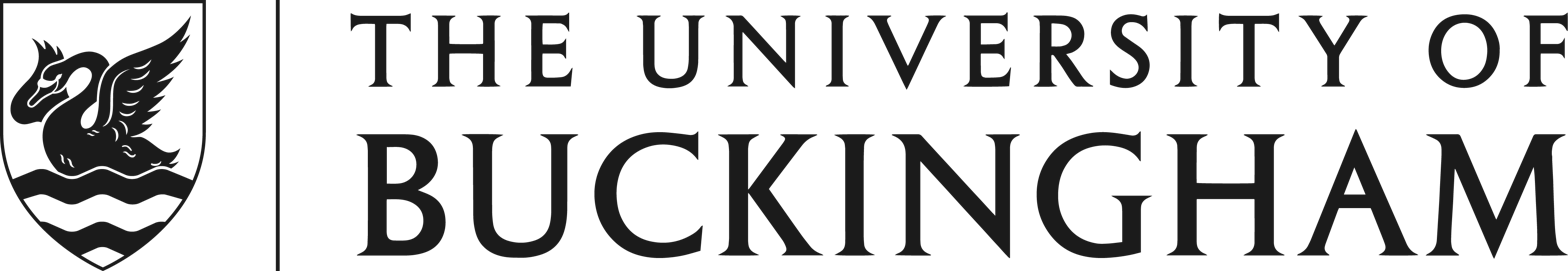

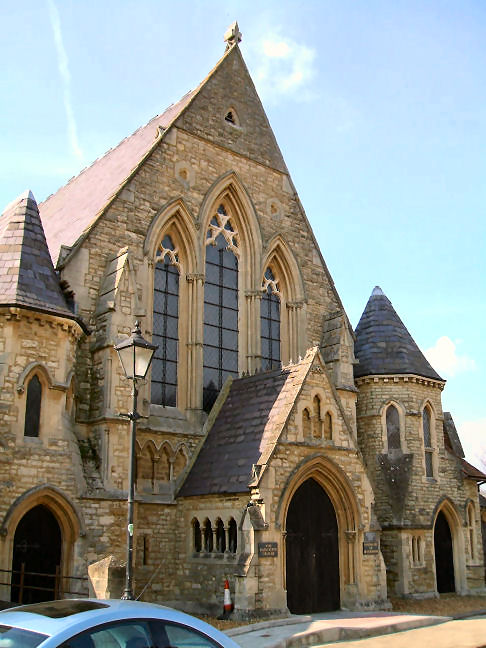
The Church of St Rumbold in Buckingham now forms part of the University of Buckingham.

The University of Buckingham (UB) is a non-profit private university in Buckingham, England, and the oldest of the country's six private universities. (Note: The other five are the non-profit Regent's University London, and Richmond American University London, and three for-profit institutions, the University of Law, BPP University and Arden University.) It was founded as the University College at Buckingham (UCB) in 1973 and admitted its first students in 1976. It was granted university status by royal charter in 1983.

Buckingham was closely linked to Margaret Thatcher, who, as Education Secretary, oversaw the creation of the university college in 1973 and as Prime Minister was instrumental in it being elevated to university status in 1983, thus creating the first private university in Britain since the establishment of the University Grants Committee in 1919. When she retired from politics in 1992, Margaret Thatcher became the university's second chancellor, a post she held until 1998. Buckingham's finances for teaching operate entirely on student fees and endowments; it does not receive direct state funding (via the Office for Students or Research England) although its students can receive student loans from the Student Loans Company. It has formal charity status as a not-for-profit institution dedicated to the ends of research and education.

== History ==
Some of the founding academics migrated from the University of Oxford, disillusioned or wary of aspects of the late-1960s ethos. On 27 May 1967, The Times published a letter from J. W. Paulley, a physician, who wrote:

"Is it now time to examine the possibility of creating at least one university in this country on the pattern of [the] great private foundations in the USA".

Three London conferences followed which explored this idea.

The university was incorporated as the "University College of Buckingham" in 1976 and received its royal charter as a university from the Queen in 1983. As of May 2016, it is the only private university in the UK with a royal charter.

Its development was influenced by the Institute of Economic Affairs, in particular, Harry Ferns and Ralph Harris, heads of the institute. The university's foundation-stone was laid by Margaret Thatcher, who became the university's chancellor between 1993 and 1998.

The university's principals (to 1983) and vice-chancellors have been: Lord Beloff, former Gladstone Professor of Politics at the University of Oxford; Alan Peacock, founder of the economics department at the University of York and Fellow of the British Academy; Michael Barrett; Richard Luce, now Lord Luce, former Minister for the Arts; Robert Taylor; Terence Kealey; Anthony Seldon and James Tooley.

From 2004, students at Buckingham have been eligible for government student loans, which led to an increase in UK students at the university.

== Campus ==
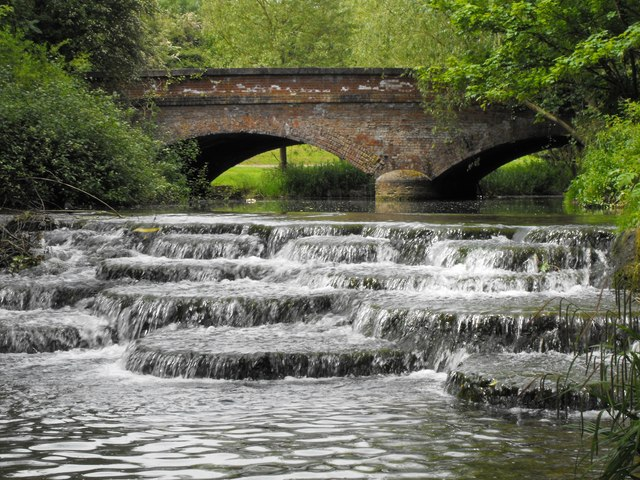
A weir and mill fall within Buckingham University's Hunter Street campus

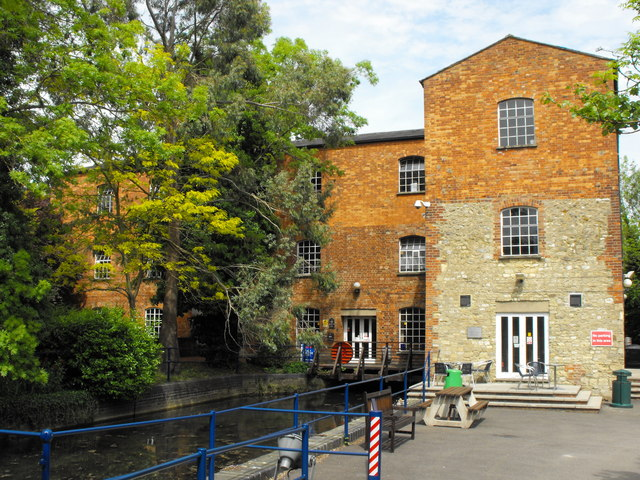
Tanlaw Mill, formerly the old Town Mill (OTM)

Near the centre of the town of Buckingham is the riverside campus, which is partly contained within a south-turning bend of the River Great Ouse. Here, on or just off Hunter Street, are some of the university's central buildings: Yeomanry House; the Anthony de Rothschild building (which contains Humanities); the Humanities Library; and also some of the student accommodation, looking northwards across the river. Prebend House, a recently restored Georgian house, contains the Vice-Chancellor's office. On the other side of Hunter Street, on the so-called 'island', is the Tanlaw Mill, one of the university's social centres; with the main refectory, the Fitness Centre, and the Students' Union Office.

Overlooking this site, on the hill above, is the extensive Chandos Building. This complex contains the Medical School. It also houses the Ian-Fairburn Lecture Theatre, the largest lecture theatre on the river-side site.

Further on, up the hill, on the London Road, is another element of the campus, in particular the schools of Law and Computing, which is housed in the Franciscan Building, surrounded by other student accommodation blocks. This is opposite the swimming pool and leisure centre. The university has been expanding in recent years. It has acquired a new site on the west side of the river, which will increase the capacity of the river-side campus as a whole.

== Organisation and governance ==
=== Chancellor ===
On 24 February 2020, Dame Mary Archer was installed as chancellor of the university.

Former chancellors were Lord Hailsham of St Marylebone (from 1983 to 1993), Baroness Thatcher (from 1993 to 1998), Martin Jacomb (from 1999 to 2010), Lord Tanlaw (from 2010 to 2013), and Lady Keswick (from 2014 to 2020).

=== Vice-chancellor ===
From October 2020, the vice-chancellor was Professor James Tooley.

== Academic profile ==
=== Teaching ===
The university's schools (faculties) are: Business, Computing, Education, Humanities and Social Sciences, Law, Medicine, Postgraduate Medicine and Allied Health, Psychology, and the Foundation Department. Each of these is presided over by a dean.

The quality of the university's provision is maintained, as at other UK universities, by an external examiner system (i.e., professors from other universities oversee and report on exams and marking), by an academic advisory council (comprising a range of subject-specialist academics from other universities), and by membership of the Quality Assurance Agency for Higher Education (QAA).

The university was created as a liberal arts college, and still describes itself as such, although in an interview with The Guardian in 2003, the then vice-chancellor Terence Kealey remarked that it had "become a vocational school for law and business for non-British students, because that's where the market has taken us". Consequently, major humanities subjects such as history and politics are no longer offered as stand-alone degrees, instead being combined with economics as a degree in international studies. Economics, however, is available as a stand-alone degree as is English literature, as a single honours subject, and in combinations with English Language, or Journalism, and related areas.

Some degree programmes at Buckingham, Law for example, place greater emphasis on exams as an assessment method rather than coursework, but in general its degree programmes balance assessment between exams and coursework.

=== School of Medicine ===
The Medical School offers a 4.5 year MB ChB medical degree, accredited by the General Medical Council. Other medical courses are offered in the School of Postgraduate Medicine and Allied Health. The school opened in 2015 as the first private medical school in the UK (since the establishment of the University Grants Committee in 1919), in partnership with the Milton Keynes NHS Foundation Trust.

==== "Alternative" medicine ====
The university ran a diploma course in "integrated medicine" that was later withdrawn under pressure from David Colquhoun, a campaigner against pseudoscience and alternative medicine. The Dean of the School, Karol Sikora, was a Foundation Fellow of Prince Charles's now-defunct alternative medicine lobby group, The Prince's Foundation for Integrated Health, and is Chair of the Faculty of Integrated Medicine, which is unaffiliated with any university but also includes Rosy Daniel and Mark Atkinson, who co-ordinated Buckingham's "integrated medicine" course. Daniel has been criticised by David Colquhoun for breaches of the Cancer Act 1939, regarding claims she made for Carctol, a herbal dietary supplement with no utility in treating cancer. Andrew Miles is on the scientific council of the College of Medicine an alternative medicine lobby group linked to the then Prince of Wales. Sikora is also a "professional member" of this organisation. The degree was stripped of validation by the University of Buckingham prior to the first graduation.

=== School of Postgraduate Medicine and Allied Health ===
Postgraduate medical courses and non-clinical allied health courses are offered in a separate school from the clinical medical degree. The School of Postgradaute Medicine and Allied Health offers postgraduate Master of Surgery and Master of Medicine programmes aimed at overseas-qualified doctors preparing for the General Medical Council's Professional and Linguistic Assessments Board in order to practice in the UK.

=== School of Education ===
The Department of Education has two aspects, research and vocational: it conducts research into education and school provision, and also maintains various PGCE courses for teacher training. The Department of Education has been home to some of the most prominent educationalists in Britain, including the late Chris Woodhead (former head of Ofsted) and Anthony O'Hear (director of the Royal Institute of Philosophy). Its postgraduate certificate in education – which deals with both the state and the independent sector – is accredited with Qualified Teacher Status which means that it also qualifies graduates to teach in the state sector.

=== School of Business ===
The University of Buckingham has a business school which offers a range of undergraduate and postgraduate qualifications for students.

The dean of the school is Debarpita Bardhan-Correia. A range of undergraduate and postgraduate business, entrepreneurship, accounting and finance degrees are offered by the Business School.

There are a number of lecturers, including many BLEU (Buckingham Lean Enterprise Unit)–certified ones, which are individuals who have completed a MSc with the university since 1999. There are also a number of lecturers who are CIM-certified.

==== Vinson Centre for Economics and Entrepreneurship ====
On 28 November 2018 the University of Buckingham opened the Vinson Building, a multi-purposed facility for use by Buckingham's students and the local community. The university's Business Enterprise undergraduates and businesses that are members of Buckinghamshire Business First use the Buckingham Enterprise Hub, which is located in the Vinson Building.

=== Degrees ===
The university offers traditional degrees over a shorter-than-usual time-frame. Students at Buckingham study for eight terms over two years, rather than nine terms over three, which (with extra teaching) fits a three-year degree into two years. (The MBChB course lasts 4.5 years.)

Because Buckingham's degrees take two years to complete, students view its degrees as cost-effective compared to other UK university courses, once the income from an extra year's employment is taken into account. In some subject areas, notably Humanities, the university is now offering its degrees over different time-scales, i.e., the two-year 'intensive' model, working the extra summer term per year, and the traditional three-year model with the usual summer break each year.

=== External degrees and validation ===
The university awards undergraduate and graduate (Masters/MBA) degrees to students who have studied at the Sarajevo School of Science and Technology.

The university validated courses in medicine at Medipathways College, a small private college based in London. Medipathways operates dentistry and medicine courses. In late 2014 Medipathways was found by the Higher Education Quality Assurance Agency "to be at serious risks of failure"; the university disagreed with the assessment. The company was wound up in September 2019.

=== Research ===
The Humanities Research Institute includes academics working in a range of disciplines, particularly military history, security studies, political history, the history of art, 19th-century literature and social history.

Alan Smithers runs the Centre for Education and Employment Research (CEER), from within the School of Humanities.

From the English department, John Drew runs Dickens Journals Online, the project which has put the whole of Dickens's journalistic output on free-access on the web.

== Reputation and rankings ==
Rankings
National rankings
- Complete (2027): 116
- Times / Sunday Times (2027): 128

The university was awarded the Times/Sunday Times University of the Year for Teaching Quality 2015–16 in 2015, at which time it ranked 38th in the Times/Sunday Times league table. The university is not listed in the Guardian University Guide. The Complete University Guide has seen a steady decline in Buckingham's ranking, from 20th in 2011 to 107th in the 2020 table. The University of Buckingham had fallen again to 123rd out of 130 universities in the University League Tables 2022. It was ranked 17th for graduate employability in 2015. It was ranked joint second for student satisfaction in the 2018 National Student Survey, however a fall in satisfaction in the 2019 National Student Survey saw it fall out of the top ten.

=== Departments ===
The league tables of individual subjects in The Guardian University Guide 2020, produced by The Guardian newspaper, ranked Buckingham 10th (out of 101) for Accounting and Finance, 18th (out of 119) for Business Management and Marketing, 6th (out of 71) for Economics, 12th (out of 105) for English and Creative Writing, 28th (out of 101) for Law, and 51st (out of 116) for Psychology. It is noted as teaching Computer Science and Information Systems, History, History of Art, Medicine, and Politics, but not ranked in the subjects.

The subject league tables in the Complete University Guide 2020 ranked Buckingham 79th for Accounting and Finance, 76th for Business & Management, 82nd for Computer Science, 52nd for Economics, 73rd for English, 49th for Law, 73rd for Politics, and 92nd for Psychology. in 2022 Economics had fallen to 69th.

=== Quality assurance ===
Buckingham has been reviewed voluntarily by the Quality Assurance Agency for Higher Education (QAA) from 2001. The QAA indicated it had limited confidence in the university's management of academic standards in 2008, as the external academic advisory council had "come to see itself as part of the Buckingham academic community" and "serious concerns about academic standards [had] been flagged by external examiners". The university was subsequently judged to "meet UK expectations" in its 2012 review. In 2015 the QAA found that Buckingham had failed to follow the university's regulations on academic misconduct with respect to possible plagiarism by students. An "alternative providers" (i.e. private universities) review by the QAA in 2017 found again that Buckingham met UK expectations in all areas.

In June 2017 the university was judged by the Teaching Excellence Framework panel to be "of the highest quality found in the UK" and given a gold award.

In December 2022, England's higher education regulator OfS (Office for Students) fined the university for publishing its 2019 audited accounts two years late, citing a "significant regulatory risk". The auditors of the accounts noted "the existence of a material uncertainty which may cast significant doubt about the group's and the university's ability to continue as a going concern". The 2020 and 2021 accounts had to that date not been published.

== University of Buckingham Press ==
The University of Buckingham Press publishes in the areas of law, education, and business through its journal articles, books, reports and other material. In 2006 the press relaunched The Denning Law Journal and it is now available in print and its whole archive is online.

It also publishes three other journals: The Buckingham Journal of Language and Linguistics, The Journal of Prediction Markets, and The Journal of Gambling Business and Economics. It has a co-publishing arrangement with Policy Exchange for its Foundations series.

== Notable alumni ==
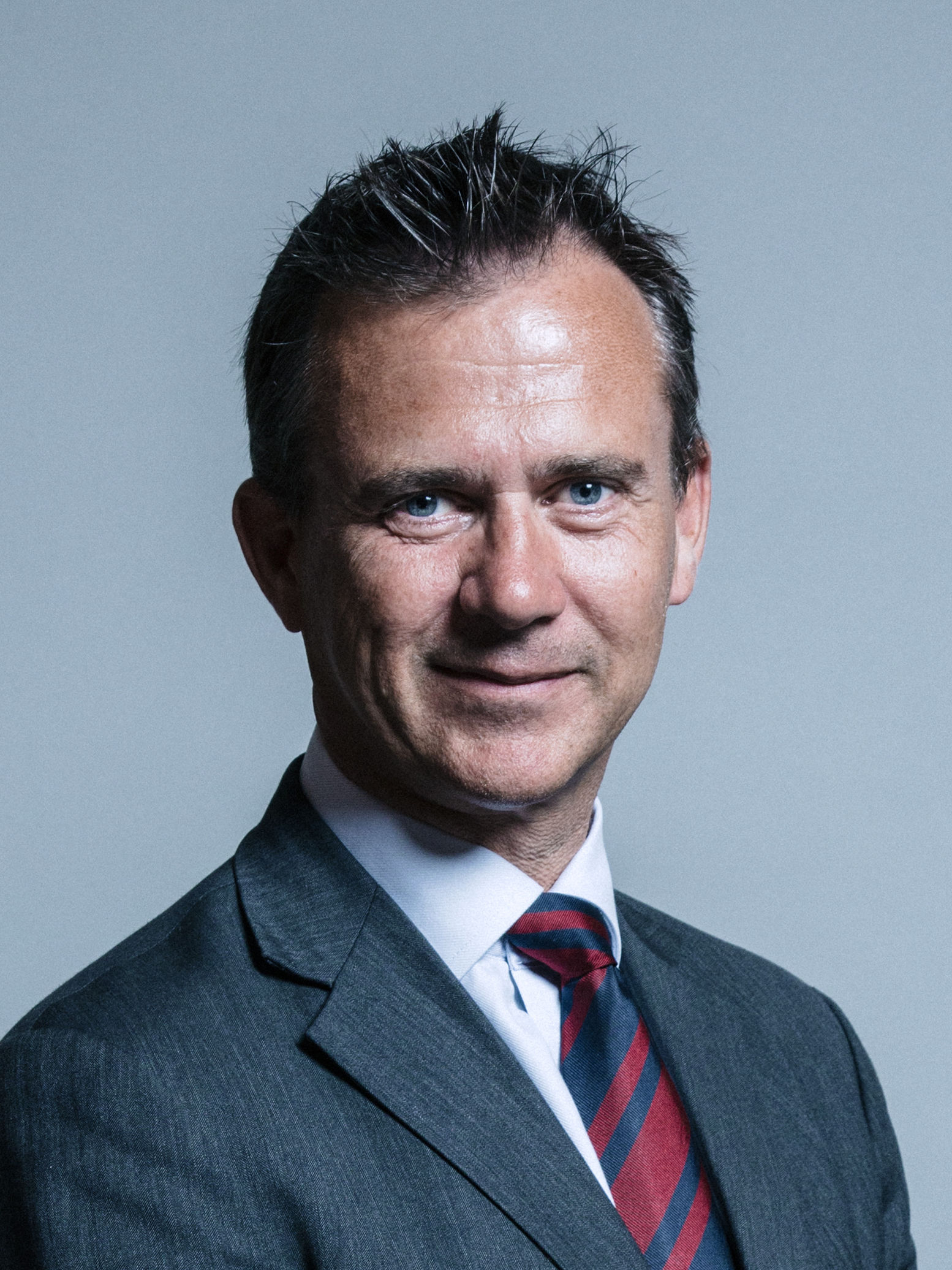
Brigadier John Mark Lancaster, Baron Lancaster of Kimbolton, graduated with a BSc in Business Studies

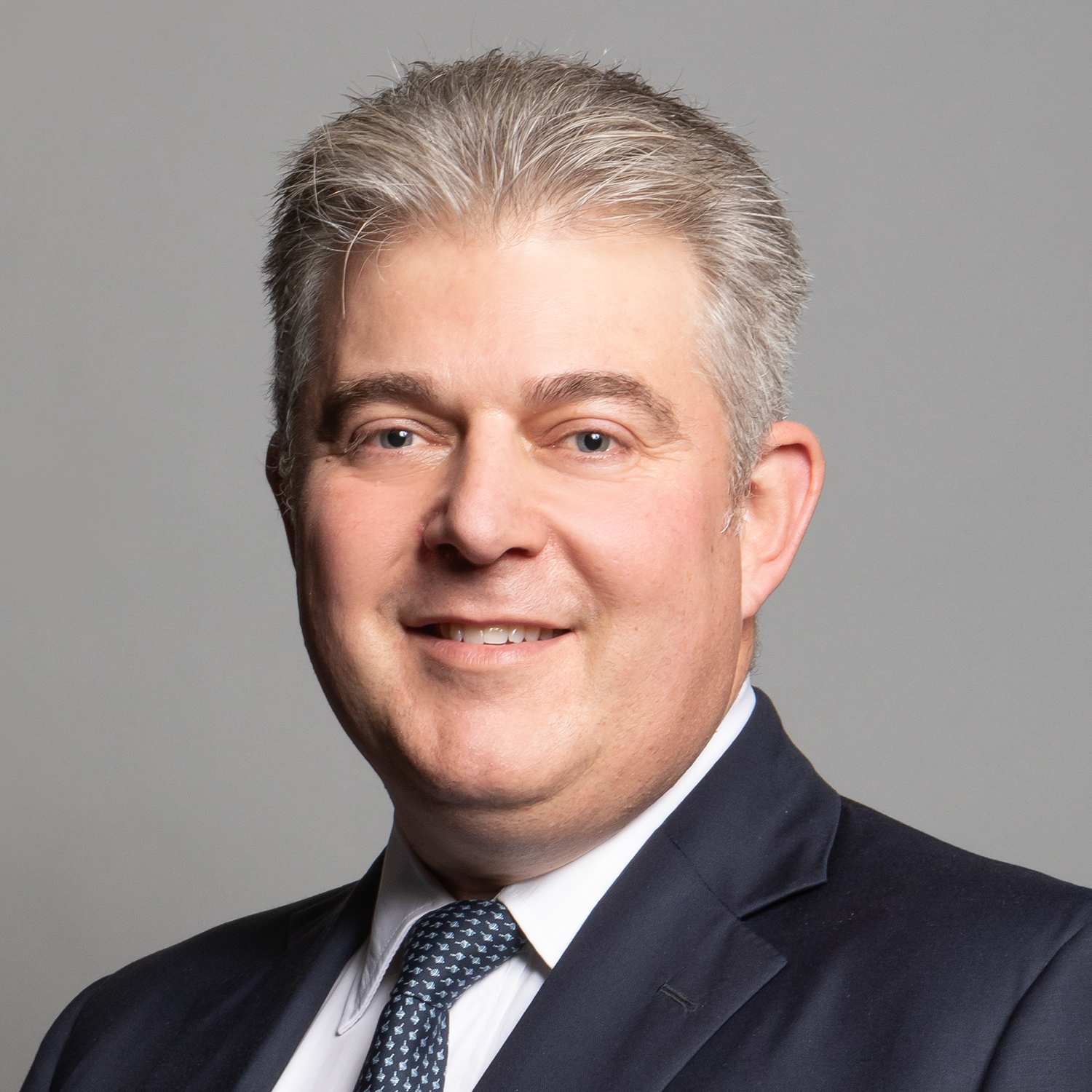
Brandon Lewis, former MP, graduated with a BSc in Economics and LLB Hons (Law)

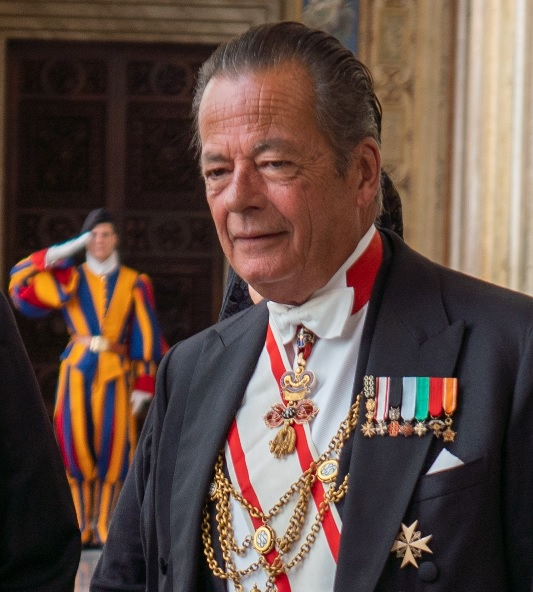
Mariano Hugo, Prince of Windisch-Graetz, graduated in 1975 with a degree in philosophy, economics and political science

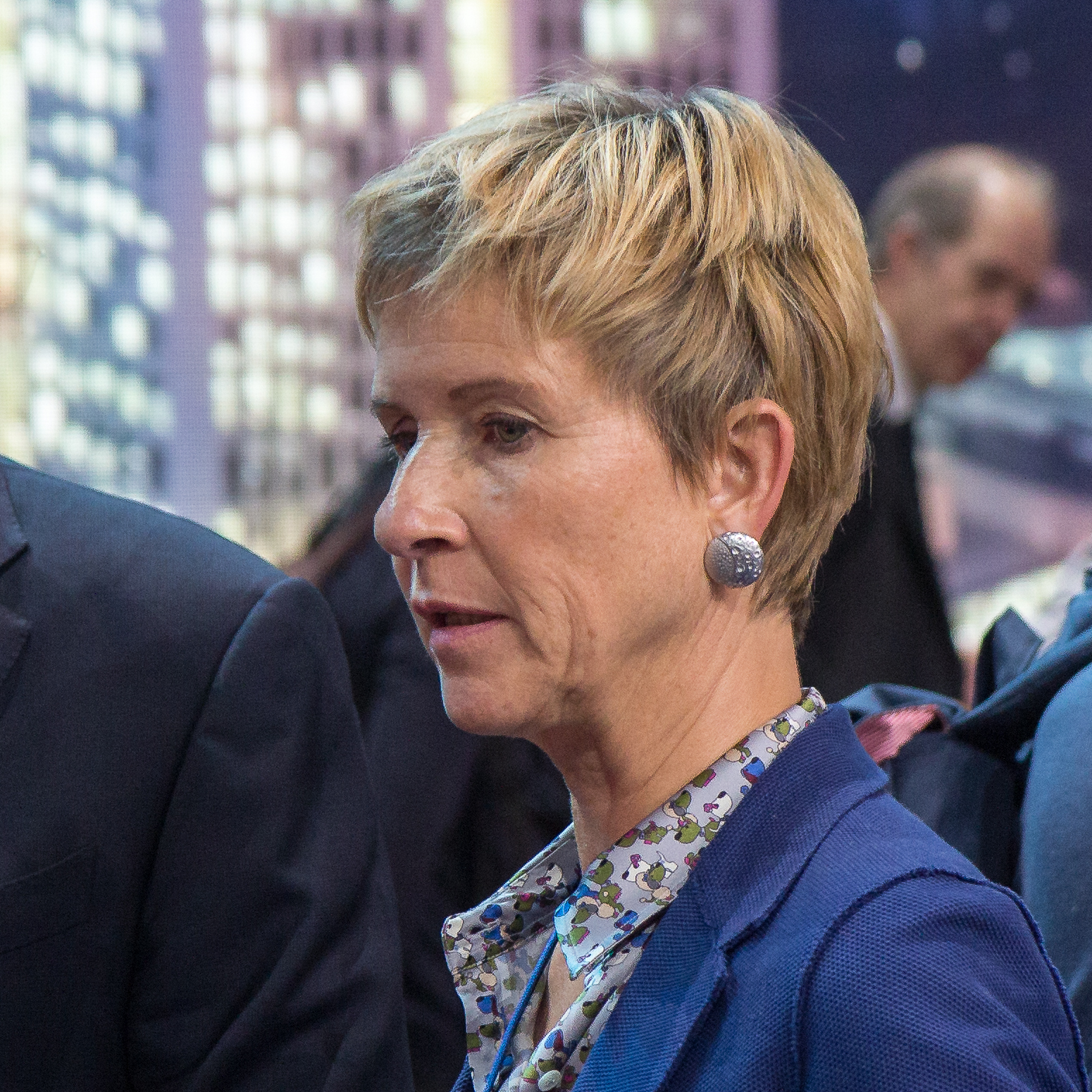
Susanne Klatten graduated with a BSc Business Studies

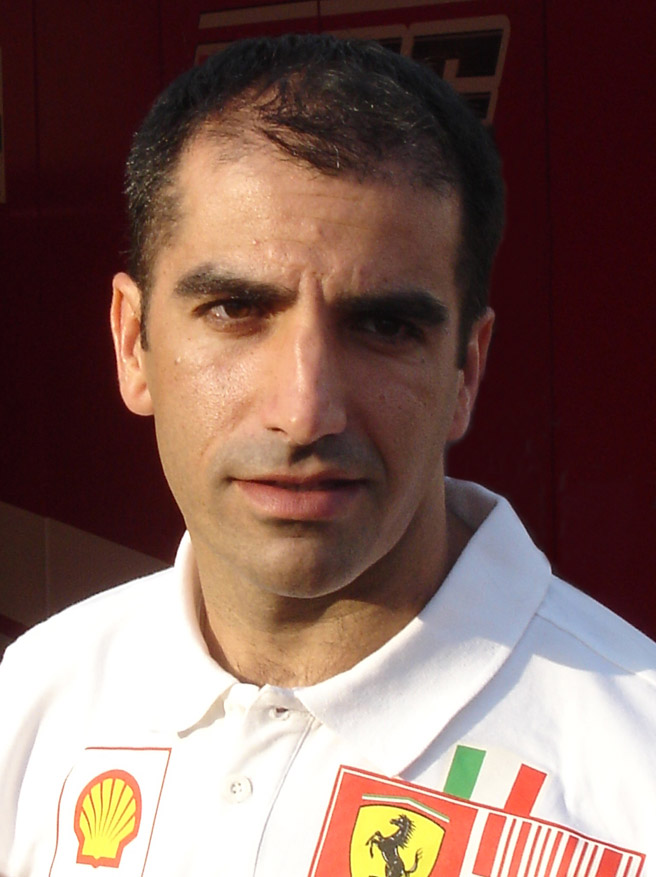
Spanish racing driver Marc Gené graduated with an economics degree and a master's degree

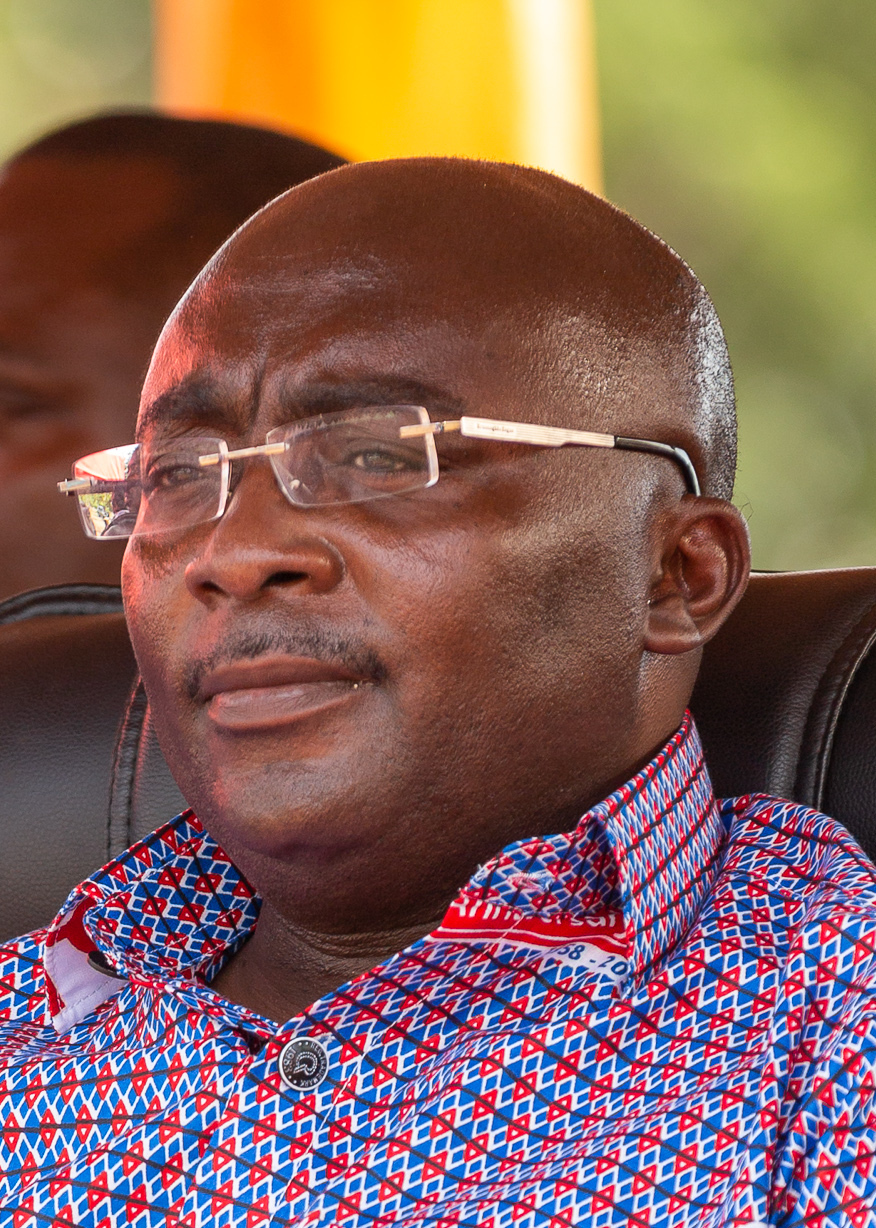
7th Vice President of Ghana, Mahamudu Bawumia, graduated in 1987 with a degree in economics

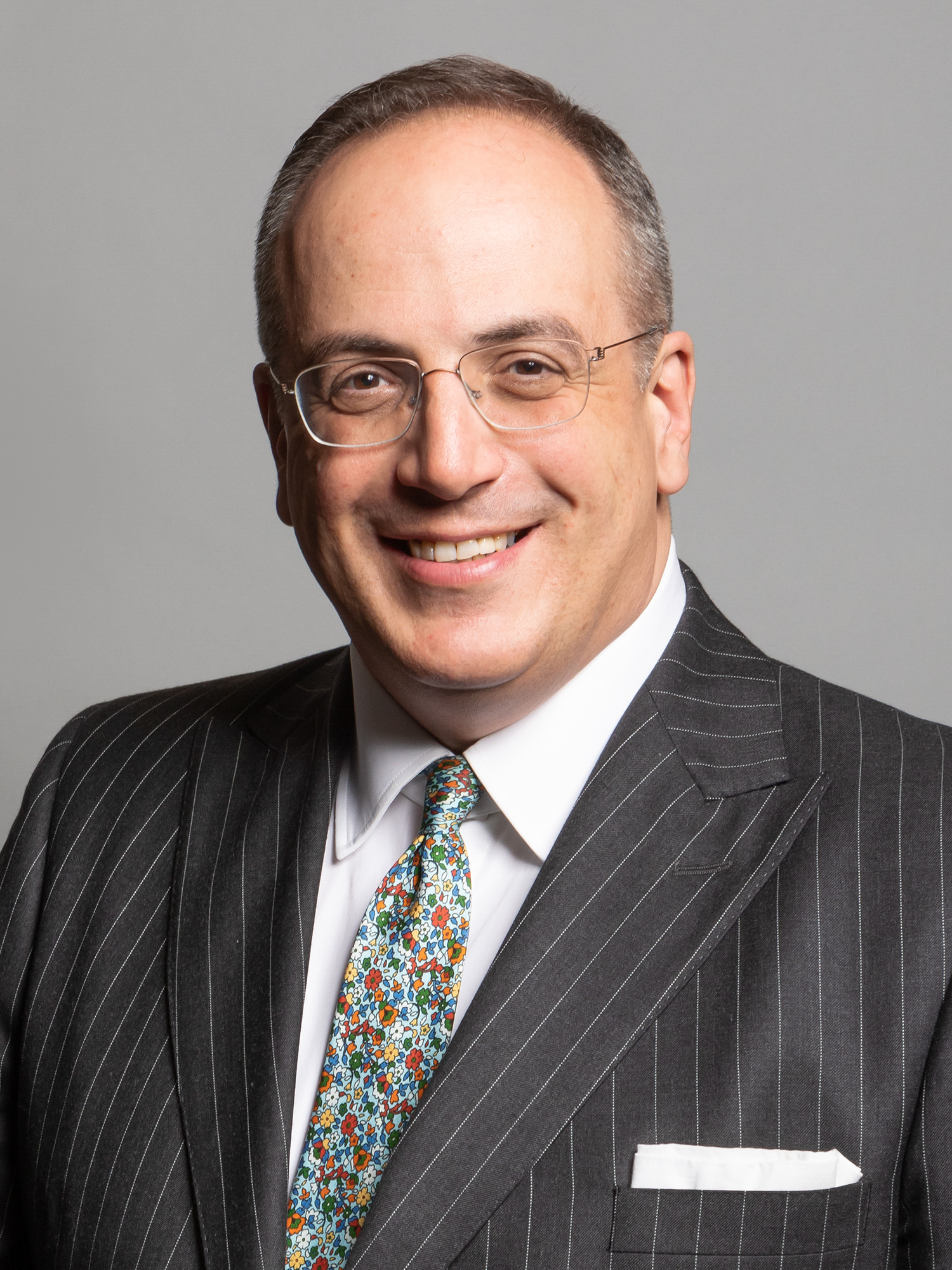
Michael Ellis, former MP, graduated with a degree in Law in 1993

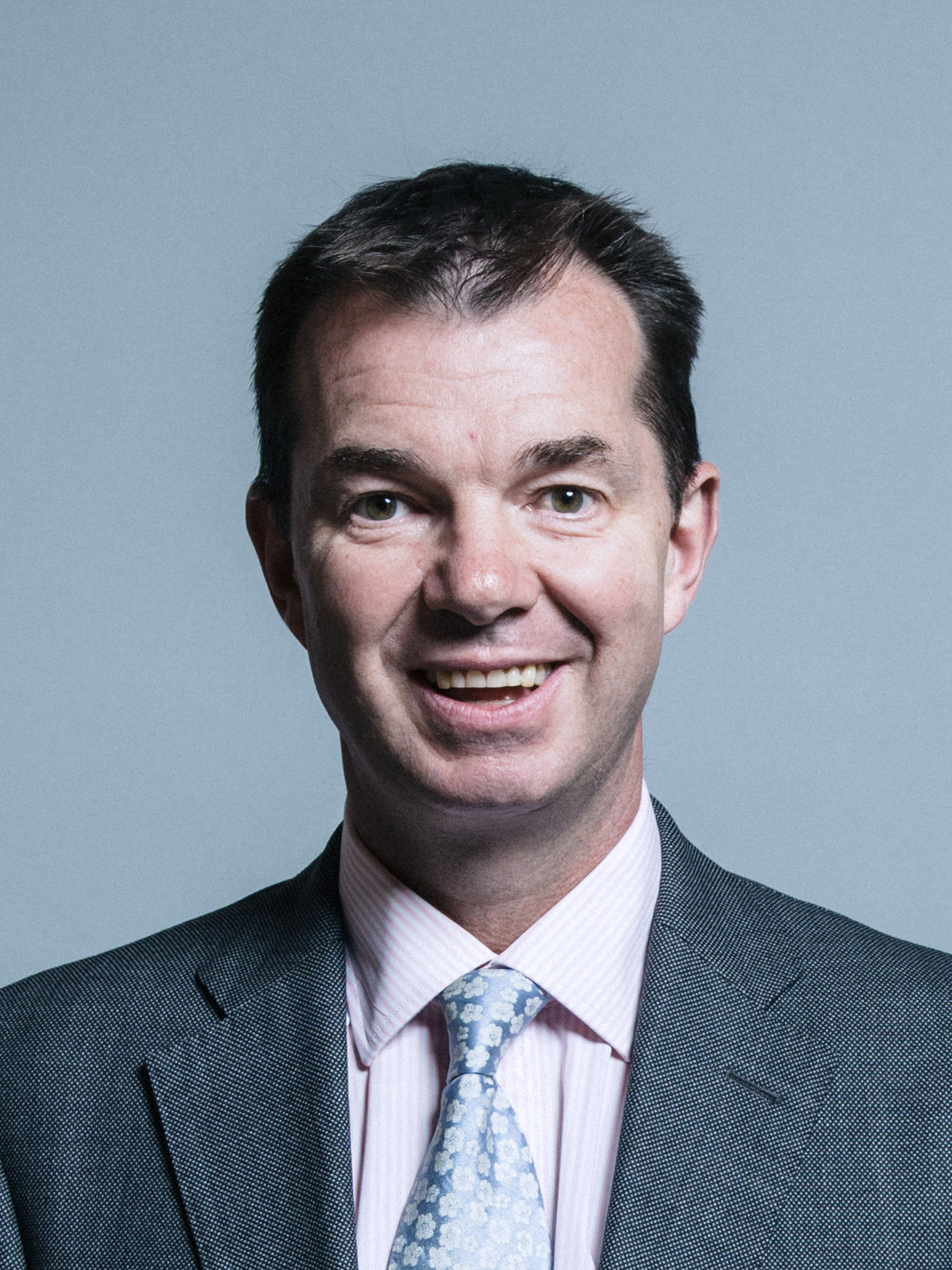
Guy Opperman, former MP for Hexham, has an Honours Degree in Law

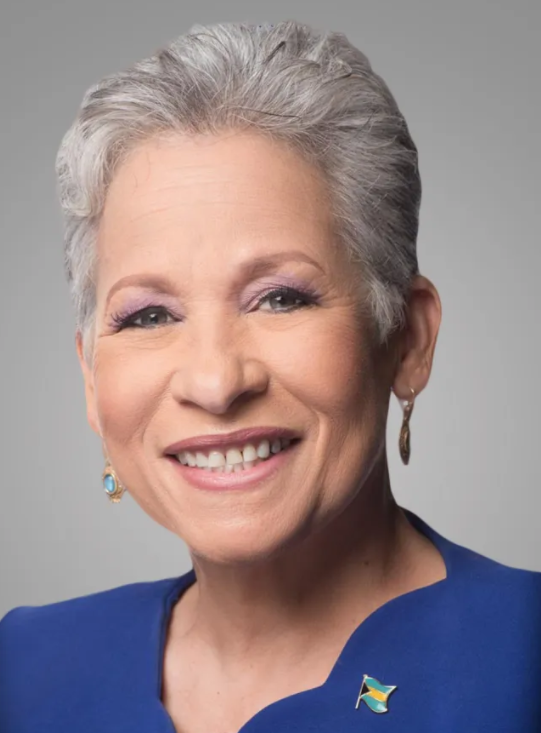
Glenys Hanna Martin, Minister of Education of the Bahamas from 2021, obtained an LLB in 1985

British alumni include Bader Ben Hirsi, playwright and director; Brandon Lewis, former MP for Great Yarmouth and former Secretary of State for Northern Ireland; Mark Lancaster, Lord Lancaster of Kimbolton, former Armed Forces minister; Graham Roos, appointed in 2011 as the university's first Creative Artist in Residence; James Henderson, former CEO of Bell Pottinger; Michael Ellis, former MP for Northampton North, former Minister for the Cabinet Office and former Paymaster General.

International alumni include Anifah Aman, Minister of Foreign Affairs of Malaysia from April 2009 to May 2018; Mohammadin Ketapi, a government minister in Malaysia; Pravind Jugnauth, MP in the National Assembly of Mauritius, former Deputy Prime Minister; Mahamudu Bawumia, former Vice-President of Ghana; Alexander Kwamina Afenyo-Markin, the Member of the Parliament of Effutu (Ghana parliament constituency); Olagunsoye Oyinlola, former Governor of Osun State, Nigeria; racing driver Marc Gené, winner of the 2009 Le Mans 24-Hour Race; Mariano Hugo, Prince of Windisch-Graetz, current head of the Austria-Italian, House of Windisch-Graetz; Susanne Klatten, BMW heiress; and Yosef Elron, a current Justice at the Supreme Court of Israel.

== Notable academics ==
Past

- Norman P. Barry (1944–2008), political philosopher
- Anne Beloff-Chain (1921–1991), biochemist
- Mark Blaug (1927–2011), economist
- Bruce Charlton, Visiting Professor of Theoretical Medicine (retired)
- Olufemi Elias, lecturer in law (retired)
- Robert Garner, political scientist
- John Jewkes (1902–1988), economist
- Geraint Jones, dean of School of Education, 2014–2018
- Terence Kealey (born 1952), former Vice-Chancellor
- Andrew George Lehmann (1922–2006), Professor of European Studies
- Ram Mudambi, lecturer in business strategy
- Dennis O'Keeffe (1939–2014), Professor of Social Science
- Sir Alan Peacock (1922–2014), economist
- Robert A. Pearce (born 1951), Professor in Law 1990–2003
- Anthony Seldon, Vice-Chancellor, 2015–2020
- Nicolaus Tideman (born 1943), economist
- Chris Woodhead (1946–2015), professor of education
- Sir David Yardley (1929–2014), Rank Foundation Professor of Law 1980–1982

Present

- Susanna Avery-Quash, art historian
- Hugh Belsey, art historian
- Lloyd Clark, military historian
- Saul David, military historian
- John M. L. Drew, Professor of English Literature
- Gert-Rudolf Flick, Visiting Professor in art history
- Simon Sebag Montefiore, Visiting Professor in humanities
- Julian Morris, Visiting Professor in economics
- Anthony O'Hear, Professor of Philosophy
- Jane Ridley, professor of modern history
- Karol Sikora, Professor of Medicine
- Alan Smithers, Director of the Centre for Education and Employment Research
- James Tooley (born 1959), Vice-Chancellor
- Neema Parvini, literature scholar and YouTuber
