= James Tooley =

British educationalist (born 1959)

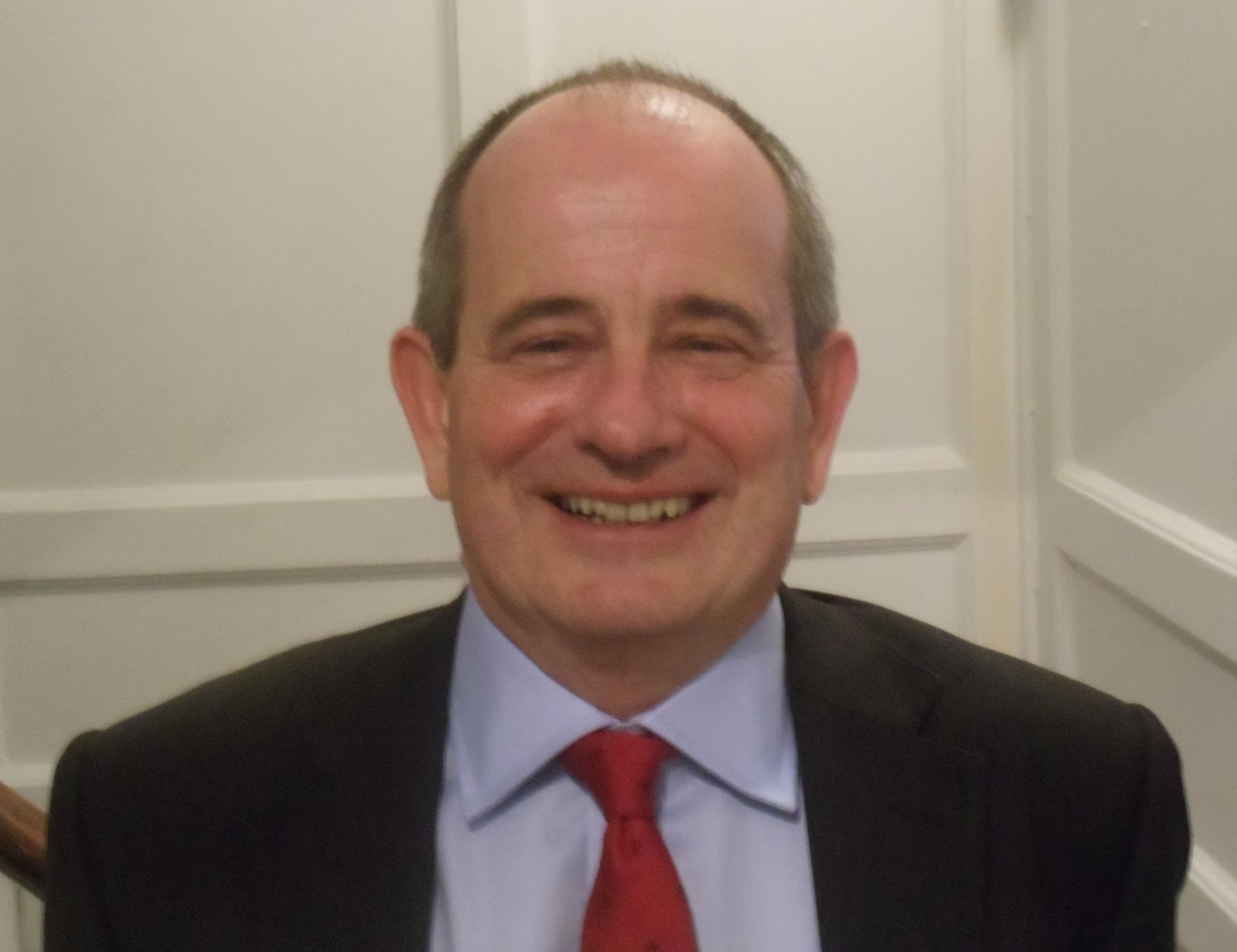
- James Tooley at the Institute of Economic Affairs in London on 25 February 2015, after his talk entitled "50 years after EG West's 'Education and the State'."
- Born: July 1959 (age 67); Southampton, England
- Education: Kingsfield School; University of Sussex; University of London
- Occupations: Educator, scholar
- Employer: University of Buckingham

James Nicholas Tooley (born July 1959, in Southampton, England) is a professor of educational entrepreneurship and of education policy at the University of Buckingham. In July 2020, Tooley was appointed as the new Vice-Chancellor of the University of Buckingham, succeeding Sir Anthony Seldon from 1 October 2020.

== Early life ==
Tooley's family moved to Bristol where he was educated at Kingsfield School, Kingswood.

== Career background ==
Tooley holds a PhD from the Institute of Education, University of London, an MSc from the Science Policy Research Unit, University of Sussex, and first class BSc honours in Logic and Mathematics, also from the University of Sussex. He began his career as a mathematics teacher in Zimbabwe (1983 to 1986), before moving to the National Foundation for Educational Research in England in 1988. He held short-term appointments at Simon Fraser University, Canada, and the University of the Western Cape, South Africa, while completing his PhD. His first post-doctoral position was with the University of Oxford's Department of Educational Studies, under Professor Richard Pring. From Oxford he moved to the University of Manchester in 1995; at the same time he also created the Education and Training Unit at the Institute of Economic Affairs in London.

Tooly was professor at the University of Newcastle upon Tyne, where he directed the E. G. West Centre. For his research on private education for the poor in India, China and Africa, Tooley was awarded the gold prize in the first International Finance Corporation/Financial Times Private Sector Development Competition in September 2006. From 2007 to 2009, he was founding President of the Education Fund, Orient Global, and lived in Hyderabad, India. He is currently chairman of education companies in Ghana (Omega Schools Franchise Ltd) and India (Empathy Learning Systems Pvt Ltd) creating low cost chains of low cost private schools. He also holds an appointment as an Adjunct Scholar at the Cato Institute and serves on the Advisory Council of the Institute of Economic Affairs as well as on the Academic Advisory Council of Civitas: The Institute for the Study of Civil Society. He also serves on the Board of Visitors of Ralston College, a start-up liberal arts college in Savannah.

== University of Buckingham ==
James Nicholas Tooley is a professor of educational entrepreneurship and of education policy at the University of Buckingham. In July 2020, Tooley was appointed as the new Vice-Chancellor of the University of Buckingham, succeeding Sir Anthony Seldon from 1 October 2020.

In October 2024 it was announced that Tooley had been suspended as Vice-Chancellor of Buckingham University because of serious allegations which had been made against him. He was reinstated in January 2025 after an investigation found that the allegations were not substantiated. The investigation was carried out by Joseph O’Brien KC, who at the same time investigated Tooley’s allegations that his suspension was due to opposition to his political views and his belief in free speech and academic freedom. O’Brien found that Tooley’s allegations were without merit.

Tooley left his role as the university's Vice-Chancellor in December 2025 at the end of his five-year contract.

== Low-cost private education ==
Tooley is best known for his work on low cost private education. He began this work in 2000, having discovered for himself the existence of low cost private schools in the slums of Hyderabad while doing consultancy for the International Finance Corporation. A major research programme was subsequently undertaken between 2003 and 2005, funded by the John Templeton Foundation, exploring the nature and existence of private schools for the poor in India, Ghana, Nigeria, Kenya and China, and comparing public and private provision for the poor. This research is reported in a range of books and publications, including The Beautiful Tree: a personal journey into how the world's poorest people are educating themselves (Penguin, New Delhi, and Cato Institute, 2009). His work has also been profiled in documentaries for the BBC and PBS: for the latter it was featured alongside the work of Nobel Laureate Muhammad Yunus and Hernando de Soto Polar.

The basic findings of the research show that in urban and peri-urban poor areas (slums and shanty towns) in India and the African countries studied, the majority of schoolchildren are in low cost private schools. After testing 24,000 children, it was found that children in the low cost private schools significantly outperform children in public schools, after controlling for background variables and the school choice process.

In 2017 Tooley announced plans to open a low cost private primary school in Durham, England. The school opened in 2018. An Ofsted report in 2019 rated the school as "Good".

== Educational philosophy and thought ==
Tooley's work has also explored the role of government in education from philosophical and other theoretical perspectives. This has resulted in academic articles challenging the work of philosophers Harry Brighouse and Adam Swift, and in the major book E. G. West: economic liberalism and the role of government in education (Continuum Library of Educational Thought, 2008).

== Prizes and awards ==
The following are the major awards won by Tooley:

- Sir Antony Fisher Memorial Prize, for The Beautiful Tree, April 2010
- Gold Prize Winner, 1st Financial Times/International Finance Corporation, Private Sector Development Research Paper Competition, September 2006
- Templeton Prize for Free Market Solutions to Poverty, 1st Prize, March 2006
- Alexis de Tocqueville Award for the Advancement of Education Freedom, May 2007
- National Free Enterprise Award, Feb 2007

== Publications ==
The following are the books and monographs published by Tooley:

- Tooley, James (2016) Imprisoned in India: Corruption and Extortion in the World's Largest Democracy; Biteback Publishing; Great Britain
- Tooley, James (2009) The Beautiful Tree: a personal journey into how the world's poorest people are educating themselves. New Delhi: Penguin; Washington, DC: Cato Institute
- Tooley, James (2008) E. G. West: economic liberalism and the role of government in education (Continuum Library of Educational Thought). New York and London: Continuum
- Tooley, James & Dixon, Pauline (2005) Private Education is Good for the Poor: a study of private schools serving the poor in low-income countries, Washington DC: Cato Institute.
- Tooley, James & Dixon, Pauline (2005) Private Schools Serving the Poor: a study from Delhi, India. New Delhi: Centre for Civil Society
- Salisbury, David & Tooley, James (eds) (2005) What Americans Can Learn from School Choice in Other Countries. Washington, DC: Cato Institute
- Tooley, James (2004) 教育的全球化能够使穷人受益吗? (Could the Globalization of Education Benefit the Poor?), Beijing: 九鼎公共事务研究所 (Cathay Institute for Public Affairs) (in Chinese)
- Tooley, James (2004) 全球教育产业——发展中国家私立教育的经验教训 (The Global Education Industry); translated by Professor Qu Hengchang. Shanghai: People's Publishing House (in Chinese)
- Tooley, James (2003) Mehr Bildung für die Armen (Occasional Paper No. 3). Potsdam: Friedrich-Naumann-Stiftung
- Tooley, James & Stanfield, James (eds) (2003) Government Failure: E. G. West on education, London: Profile Books
- Tooley, James; Dixon, Pauline & Stanfield, James (2003) Delivering Better Education: market solutions to education London: Adam Smith Institute
- Tooley, James & Dixon, Pauline (2003) Private Schools for the Poor: a case study from India. Reading: CfBT
- Tooley, James (2002) The Miseducation of Women. London and New York:Continuum
- Tooley, James (2001) The Global Education Industry; 2nd edition, London and Washington DC, Institute of Economic Affairs and International Finance Corporation, in association with Profile Books, London
- Tooley, James (ed.) (2001) Buckingham at 25: freeing the universities from state control. London: Profile Books
- Tooley, James (2001) The Enterprise of Education: opportunities and challenges for India. New Delhi: Liberty Institute
- Tooley, James (2000) Reclaiming Education. London: Cassell
- Tooley, James (1999) The Global Education Industry. London and Washington DC: Institute of Economic Affairs in association with International Finance Corporation
- Tooley, James with Howes, Andy (1999) The Seven Virtues of Highly Effective Schools. London: TC Trust
- Tooley, James with Darby, Doug (1998) Educational Research: a critique London: Ofsted
- Seville, Adrian & Tooley, James (1997) The Debate on Higher Education: challenging the assumptions London: Institute of Economic Affairs
- Tooley, James (1996) Education without the State London: Institute of Economic Affairs
- Tooley, James (1995) Disestablishing the School Aldershot: Avebury Press
- Tooley, James (1993) A Market-Led Alternative for the Curriculum: breaking the code. London: Tufnell Press
- Mason, Keith & Tooley, James (1992) Moving Forward in Mathematics: a diagnostic teaching approach. Windsor: NFER/Nelson
