= The Wellington Academy =

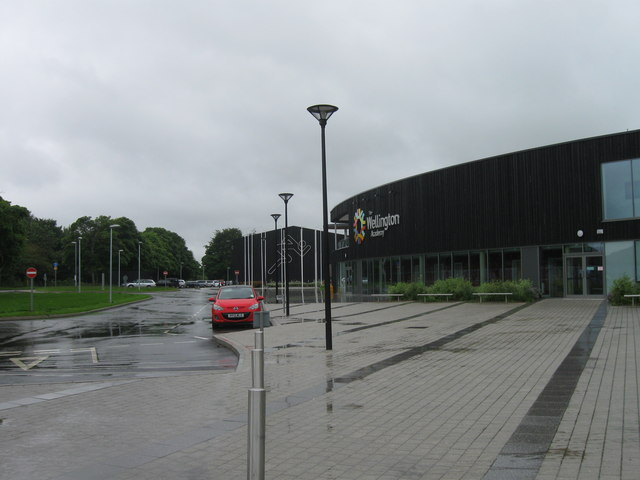

Location
- Tidworth Road; Wiltshire, SP11 9RR; England; 51°14′24″N 1°39′50″W

Information
- Type: Academy
- Motto: Inquisitive, Ambitious, Independent
- Established: 2009
- Founder: Wellington Academy Trust
- School district: Tidworth
- Department for Education URN: 135804 Tables
- Ofsted: Reports
- President: Prince Andrew (as Duke of York)
- Headmistress: Mrs Hannah Whitaker
- Staff: 170
- Gender: Coeducational
- Age: 11 to 18
- Enrolment: 1,083 (May 2023)
- Cadet cap badge: 26 Royal Engineers
- Website: Official website

The Wellington Academy, founded in 2009, is an 11–19 non-selective state-funded co-educational day school near Ludgershall, Wiltshire, England. The school has academy status and was initially supported by Wellington College, an independent school in Berkshire.

== History ==
The Wellington Academy opened in 2009 on the site of an earlier school. Its new building was designed by London-based architects BDP, built by Kier, and was shortlisted in the best academy category for the Building Schools for the Future Awards in 2009.

The President of the academy is the Duke of York, who performed the official opening of the new campus in November 2011. The first Headteacher was Andy Schofield who oversaw its setup, doubled its size to over 1,000 pupils and established its sixth form.

== Characteristics ==
The school's site is in Tidworth parish, about three-quarters of a mile (1.2 km) south-west of the town of Ludgershall, on the A3026 road towards Tidworth. The campus houses a community sports and fitness centre with bowling green, a hair salon, a cadet centre with indoor shooting range, and Castledown FM's radio studios. The academy has a skills centre in the adjacent Castledown Business Park.

The school is near to Tidworth Garrison on Salisbury Plain, and in 2011 almost half of the school's pupils came from service families.

== School performance ==
The Wellington Academy's first set of results in 2010 established the school as one of Wiltshire's highest performing. Summer of 2015 saw the academy achieve its best exam results for both GCSE and GCE.

The academy was visited by Ofsted in December 2010 and was deemed to have made outstanding progress since opening. As of 2022, the school's most recent inspection was in 2016, with an outcome of Good.

== Sponsored academy ==
The Wellington Academy is the first in the country to take its name from an independent school, in this case Wellington College, founded as a national monument to the Duke of Wellington by Queen Victoria in 1859. Other independent schools were initially slow to follow suit, despite a campaign led by Wellington College's former Master Anthony Seldon. However, by 2011, around 28 independent schools were helping to run academies, including Sevenoaks School, Dulwich College, Malvern College, Marlborough College, Oundle School, Uppingham School and Winchester College, with strong encouragement from Government for even greater involvement.

== Predecessors ==
The first school on the site was Tidworth Down School, a secondary modern which opened in 1940. From 1965 the school was for boys only, with girls attending the newly built Ludgershall Castle School, then in 1978 the girls rejoined the boys and Tidworth Down was renamed Castledown School, a comprehensive.
