= Ram Mudambi =

Ram Mudambi is the Frank M. Speakman Professor of Strategy at the Fox School of Business and Management at Temple University. He has published over a hundred refereed journal articles and six books on the multinational strategies of entrepreneurial firms; the location and research and development strategies of multinational firms, and the politics of international business. Mudambi served as a co-editor of the Global Strategy Journal published by the Strategic Management Society (SMS). He also serves as a department editor at the Journal of International Business Policy published by the Academy of International Business (AIB). He is a Consulting Editor of the Journal of International Business Studies, and serves on the editorial boards of the Asia Pacific Journal of Management, Journal of World Business, Industry and Innovation and the Journal of International Management.

Prior to joining Temple University, Mudambi taught at Case Western Reserve University in Cleveland, Ohio and the University of North Carolina at Chapel Hill. He taught in Europe for seven years at the University of Reading and the University of Buckingham. He is a Fellow of the academy of the University of Messina in Italy. He completed his master's degree at the London School of Economics in the United Kingdom and his Ph.D. at Cornell University.

== Books ==
- The organisation of the firm international business perspectives. by Ram Mudambi; Martin J. Routledge, 2002. ISBN 0-203-28225-6 (446 libraries hold, according to WorldCat)
- Rules and reason : perspectives on constitutional political economy ed by Ram Mudambi; Pietro Navarra; Giuseppe Sobbrio. : Cambridge University Press, 2001. ISBN 0-521-65057-7 (192 libraries hold)
- Economic and management methods for tourism and hospitality research. by Tom Baum; Ram Mudambi Wiley, ©1999. ISBN 0-471-98392-6
- Rules, choice and strategy : the political economy of Italian electoral reform by Ram Mudambi; Pietro Navarra; Giuseppe Sobbrio. Edward Elgar, ©2001.
- Economic welfare, international business, and global institutional change by Ram Mudambi; Pietro Navarra; Giuseppe Sobbrio Northampton, MA : E. Elgar, ©2003.
- Privatization and globalization : the changing role of the state in business by Ram Mudambi. Edward Elgar, ©2003. ISBN 1-85898-951-5
