= Stuart Ball =

British historian

- Born: Stuart Ryan Ball
- Occupations: Professor of Modern History, University of Leicester (emeritus since 2016)
- Known for: Contributions to modern British political history, especially relating to the Conservative Party.
- Awards: Commander of the Order of the British Empire (2018); Fellow of the Royal Historical Society (since 1990)

Stuart Ryan Ball, CBE, FRHistS, is a political historian who retired in 2016 as professor of Modern British History at the University of Leicester, having taught there for 37 years; he is now emeritus professor of Modern History there. He specialises in the history of the Conservative Party.

== Career ==
Stuart Ryan Ball left Eltham College in 1974 to study history at the University of St Andrews. In 1979, he was appointed to a lectureship at the University of Leicester, and taught there until his retirement in 2016, by which time he was professor of Modern British History. In 1990, he was elected Fellow of the Royal Historical Society. As of 2017, he is Historical Consultant to the Conservative Party Archive at the Bodleian Library, sits on the editorial committee of the journal Parliamentary History, and is treasurer of the Parliamentary History Trust.

=== Awards and honours ===
In the 2018 New Year Honours, Ball was appointed a Commander of the Order of the British Empire (CBE) for service to political history. He has been a Fellow of the Royal Historical Society (FRHistS) since 1990.

== Research ==
Ball's research has focused on British politics between the two world wars, with special focus on the Conservative Party. He has also studied the history of parliament in modern Britain. His books include:

- (editor) The Advent of Democracy: The Impact of the 1918 Reform Act on British Politics (Wiley, 2018)
- (editor) Conservative Politics in National and Imperial Crisis: Letters from Britain to the Viceroy of India 1926–1931 (Ashgate, 2014)
- Portrait of a Party: The Conservative Party in Britain 1918–1945 (Oxford University Press, 2013)
- Dole Queues and Demons: British Election Posters from the Conservative Party Archive (Bodleian Library Press, 2011)
- (edited with Anthony Seldon) Recovering Power: The Conservatives in Opposition since 1867 (Palgrave, 2005)
- Winston Churchill (British Library & New York University Press, 2003)
- (editor, with Ian Holliday) Mass Conservatism: The Conservatives and the Public since the 1880s (Frank Cass, 2002)
- (editor) Parliament and Politics in the Age of Churchill and Attlee: the Headlam Diaries 1935–1951, Royal Historical Society, Camden 5th series, vol. 14 (Cambridge University Press, 1999)
- (editor) The Conservative Party since 1945 (Manchester University Press, 1998)
- (editor with Anthony Seldon) The Heath Government 1970–1974: A Reappraisal (Longman, 1996)
- The Conservative Party and British Politics 1902–1951 (Longman, 1995)
- (editor with Anthony Seldon) Conservative Century: the Conservative Party since 1900 (Oxford University Press, 1994)
- (editor) Parliament and Politics in the Age of Baldwin and MacDonald: The Headlam Diaries 1923–1935 (The Historians' Press, 1992)
- Baldwin and the Conservative Party: The Crisis of 1929–1931 (Yale University Press, 1988)
