= Terence Kealey =

British biochemist (born 1952)

George Terence Evelyn Kealey
- Born: 16 February 1952 (age 74)
- Education: Balliol College, Oxford
- Spouse: Sally
- Scientific career
- Workplaces: University of Buckingham; University of Cambridge; University of Oxford
- Thesis: Studies on actomyosin in rat parotid and on eccrine sweat glands (1982)
- Doctoral advisor: Philip Randle
- Website: buckingham.ac.uk/directory/dr-terence-kealey/

George Terence Evelyn Kealey (born 16 February 1952) is a British biochemist who was Vice-Chancellor of the University of Buckingham, a private university in Britain. He was appointed Professor of Clinical Biochemistry in 2011. Prior to his tenure at Buckingham, Kealey lectured in clinical biochemistry at the University of Cambridge. He is well known for his outspoken opposition to public funding of science.

== Education ==
Kealey was educated at Charterhouse School, completed his degrees of Bachelor of Medicine, Bachelor of Surgery and Bachelor of Science in biochemistry at St Bartholomew's Hospital, then gained a Doctor of Philosophy degree from Balliol College, Oxford, in 1982 for a thesis on actomyosin in rat parotid and eccrine sweat glands.

== Publications ==
Kealey occasionally writes pieces for The Daily Telegraph and is the author of several books on the economics of science. He has written about how Margaret Thatcher transformed Britain's universities and schools as Secretary of State for Education and Science from 1970 to 1974, and has suggested that a debate with him in 1985 helped to shape her views on the Nobel Prize and the role of the state in sponsoring science. He cites the economic study of the business of science by Angus Maddison, as well as a survey entitled The Sources of Economic Growth in OECD Countries (2003), which found that between 1971 and 1998 only privately funded research had stimulated economic growth in the world's 21 leading industrialised countries. However, this theory has been challenged by a study which agrees with Kealey's criticism of the linear model but tries to support the value of state funding by the production of externalities.

- The economic laws of scientific research. London: Macmillan Press. 1996. ISBN 978-0-312-17306-7.
- Sex, science and profits. London: William Heinemann. 2008. ISBN 978-0-434-00824-7.
- Breakfast is a Dangerous Meal: Why You Should Ditch Your Morning Meal For Health and Wellbeing. London: Fourth Estate. 2016. p. 352. ISBN 978-0008172343. OCLC 994867927.

== Advocacy of privatisation of higher education ==
In February 2010, Kealey proposed the establishment of a new independent university, modelled on American liberal arts colleges, which would concentrate on undergraduate teaching rather than research. It was to be based at the disused Wye College in Kent, owned by Imperial College. The plan was supported by the Headmasters' and Headmistresses' Conference (HMC), whose 243 members include independent schools such as Eton College, Winchester College and St Paul's School, London. Kealey believed that complaints about impersonal teaching and oversized classes at many traditional universities mean there would be strong demand for higher education with staff-student ratios similar to that provided by independent secondary schools.

Academic offices
Preceded by Robert A. Pearce (acting)	Vice-Chancellor of the University of Buckingham; 2001–2014	Succeeded by Sir Anthony Seldon
