= John M. L. Drew =

British literary scholar

John M. L. Drew (born 1966) is a British literary scholar and Professor of English Literature and Head of the English Department at the University of Buckingham. He is known for his works on the journalistic work of Charles Dickens and his contemporaries. Drew is the director of the international research project Dickens Journals Online.

== Books ==
- Dickens the Journalist, John M. L. Drew, London, Palgrave Macmillan, 2003
