= Susanna Avery-Quash =

British art historian

Susanna Mary Avery-Quash (born 1970) is a British art historian, curator, and author.

== Early life ==
Avery-Quash is a daughter of Charles Avery of Beckenham, and his wife Kathleen Jones. When she was born, her father was deputy keeper of sculpture at the Victoria and Albert Museum and later directed the sculpture department of Christie's. She was educated at St Paul's Girls' School and Peterhouse, Cambridge, where she took a first degree in modern languages, followed by a diploma at the Courtauld Institute of Art, and then returned to Cambridge to graduate Ph.D.

Known in her early life as Susanna M. Avery, on her marriage to Ben Quash, also a member of Peterhouse, she added his name to her own.

== Career ==
In 1997, Avery-Quash was appointed as Munby Fellow in Bibliography at the University of Cambridge, then in 2002 became a lecturer in the history of art there. From 2006 to 2009 she was Eastlake Research Fellow at the National Gallery, since when she has held other posts, including senior research curator (history of collecting) and assistant curator. She is senior research fellow in the history of art at the University of Buckingham and an honorary research fellow at Birkbeck, University of London.

She is also a Fellow of the Society of Antiquaries of London and a trustee of the Francis Haskell Memorial Fund and the Society for the History of Collecting.

Avery-Quash researches the National Gallery’s collections of art and is curator for 19th-century items in its history collection. She writes about the history of art collections, both private and public, and the growth of the art market. A focus of her research has been Sir Charles Eastlake, founding director of the National Gallery. With Julie Sheldon she is co-author of a biography of Eastlake, Art for the Nation: The Eastlakes and the Victorian Art World (2011) and is editor of The Travel Notebooks of Charles Eastlake (2011).

In 2013, she co-organised an international conference on Discovering the Trecento in the Nineteenth Century. She has published articles on the role of Anglican clergy and of Prince Albert as collectors of early Italian art.

== Selected publications ==
- Luke Syson, Dillian Gordon, with contributions by Susanna Avery-Quash, Pisanello: Painter to the Renaissance Court (London: National Gallery Company, 2001) ISBN 1-85709-932-X
- Introductory essay in Dillian Gordon, National Gallery Catalogues: The Fifteenth Century Italian Paintings, Vol. 1 (London, 2003)
- Art for the Nation: The Eastlakes and the Victorian Art World (Yale University Press, 2011), with Professor Julie Sheldon ISBN 978-1857095074
- The Travel Notebooks of Charles Eastlake (Walpole Society, 2011), editor ASIN B07FPMVC81
- Truth & beauty: the Pre-Raphaelites and the old masters (Fine Arts Museums of San Francisco, 2018), with Melissa E. Buron ISBN 978-3-7913-5728-7
- London and the Emergence of a European Art Market, 1780-1820, with Christian Huemer (Getty Research Institute, 2019)
- Leonardo in Britain: Collections and Historical Reception (Ad Ilissum, 2019), with Juliana Barone ISBN 978-8822266248
- The Georgian London Town House: Building, Collecting and Display (2019), with Kate Retford
- National Gallery Technical Bulletin: Volume 40 (2019), with Marika Spring ISBN 978-1857096491
- Old Masters Worldwide: Markets, Movements and Museums, 1789–1939 (2020), with Barbara Pezzini
- Creating a National Collection: The Partnership between Southampton City Art Gallery and the National Gallery (Southampton City Art Gallery, 2021) ISBN 978-1838469900
- Christine Riding, Gainsborough's Blue boy: the return of a British icon (National Gallery Company, 8 February 2022), with contributions by Susanna Avery-Quash, Melinda McCurdy, Jacqueline Riding and Imogen Tedbury ISBN 978-1857096804
