= Modern British History =

- Discipline: History
- Language: English

Publication details
- Former name: Twentieth Century British History
- Publisher: Oxford University Press (United Kingdom)
- Frequency: Quarterly

Standard abbreviations
- ISO 4: Mod. Br. Hist.

Indexing
- ISSN: 0955-2359 (print); 1477-4674 (web)

Links
- Journal homepage; Online archive

Modern British History is a peer reviewed academic journal of the history of Britain in the twentieth century. It is published by Oxford University Press. It launched in 1990 and changed its name in 2024 from Twentieth Century British History to Modern British History to better reflect the broader time period discussed in the journal
