= L. Ron =

L. Ron (or L Ron) may refer to:

In people:

- L. Ron Hubbard, (1911–1986), founder of Scientology
- L. Ron Hubbard Jr., (1934–1991), son of L. Ron Hubbard

In music:

- L. Ron (album), a noise rock album by Barkmarket

In comics:

- L-Ron, fictional DC Comics character
