= Pauline Dixon =

- Born: 12 February 1962 (age 64); Newcastle Upon Tyne
- Education: Doctor of Philosophy
- Occupations: Professor of International Development and Education
- Employer: Newcastle University
- Awards: Luminary Award 2013, South Africa
- Website: http://www.ncl.ac.uk/ecls/staff/profile/pauline.dixon

Pauline Dixon is a Professor of International Development and Education at Newcastle University in North East England. She is the Co-Director of the Global Challenges Academy and the Newcastle University Lead for the Global Challenges Summit. She is the PI for the Women in Development Network and is currently a Co-Investigator on the Water and Sanitation Hub funded by UKRI GCRF.

== Career background ==
Dixon has been involved in multiple projects predominately focusing on researching the role of school choice and potential solutions for achieving Education For All in Asia and Africa. Her work is closely linked to the philosophy of Professor James Tooley, who she has worked with on various funded John Templeton Foundation projects. Between 2003–2005 both explored the nature and existence of private schools for the poor in India, resulting in multiple academic articles and exposing an under the radar network of schools throughout the developing world. Following the success of the project both Tooley and Dixon lead on further Templeton funded research that aimed to look at 'education in conflict zones' with a focus on African schools (2011-2013). Her last research project was funded by the ESRC focusing on Dar es Salaam, Tanzania and identifying high ability and creative children in poor areas of the Kinondoni District.

In conjunction with her work in India she has worked as an advisor and education consultant for the British-based charity Absolute Return for Kids (ARK), where she helped initiate the ASPIRE programme (Allow Synthetic Phonics to Improve Results in English).

Dixon delivers keynote speeches and presentations around the world including at Capitol Hill, Washington D.C., University of Connecticut, Brown University, Free Market Foundation of South Africa, Johannesburg, Waterloo Global Science Initiative, and Panama City. She also delivers talks in Europe including at Uppsala University, Riksdagen, Zurich, Liechtenstein, Durham, Glasgow, London, and Vienna. She has also presented the research findings to government officials in India and Africa. She gave a TEDx talk at Glasgow in 2012 "How Private Schools are Serving the Poorest".

== Prizes and awards ==
- The Times Literary Supplement Books of the Year for "International Aid and Private Schools for the Poor: Smiles, Miracles and Markets" Edward Elgar, 29 November 2013.
- Luminary Award from the Free Market Foundation of South Africa. Honours individuals making a unique contribution to the advancement of mankind. Awarded 2013.
- First place Winners – EG West Centre for their research in Asia and Africa. The 2006 Templeton Freedom Prize for Excellence in Promoting Liberty in Free Market Solutions to Poverty. Presented in Colorado Springs, USA April 2006.
- Don Lavoie Memorial Graduate Student Essay Contest Winner 2003 for "Regulation of Private Schooling for Low-Income Families in India: An Austrian Economic Approach"
- 2001 winner to attend the ‘Advanced Seminar in Austrian Economics’, in New York City.

== Publications ==
Dixon, P., Egalite, A.J., Humble, S., Wolf, P. (2019) Experimental results from a four-year targeted education voucher program in the slums of Delhi, India. World Development 2019, 124, 104644.

Humble, S., Dixon, P., Mpofu, E. (2018) Factor Structure of the Torrance Tests of Creative Thinking Figural Form A in Kiswahili speaking children: multidimensionality and influences on creative behaviour. Thinking Skills and Creativity, 27, 33-44.

Humble, S., Dixon, P., Schagen, I. (2018) Assessing intellectual potential in Tanzanian children in poor areas of Dar es Salaam. Assessment in Education: Principles, Policy and Practice, 25(4), 399-414.

Dixon, P., Humble, S., and Counihan, C. (2015) Eds., Handbook of International Development and Education, Cheltenham UK and MA, USA, Edward Elgar.

Dixon, P. (2014) International Aid and Private Schools for the Poor: Smiles, Miracles and Markets, Worldwide Paperback edition: MA, USA and Gloucestershire, UK. Edward Elgar.

Wolf, P., Egalite, A.J., and Dixon, P. (2015) Private School Choice in Developing Countries: Experimental Results from Delhi, India, In Dixon, P., Humble, S., and Counihan, C., (Eds.) The Handbook of International Development and Education, MA, USA, Edward Elgar.

Dixon, P., Humble, S., and Marshall, P. (2015) International aid and schooling for the poor, In, Dixon, P., Humble, S., and Counihan, C., (Eds.) The Handbook of International Development and Education, MA, USA, Edward Elgar.

Dixon P, Schagen I, Seedhouse P. The impact of an intervention on children's reading and spelling ability in low-income schools in India. School Effectiveness and School Improvement 2011, 22(4), 461–482.
