= Yosef Elron =

Israeli jurist (born 1955)

Joseph Elron
- יוסף אלרון
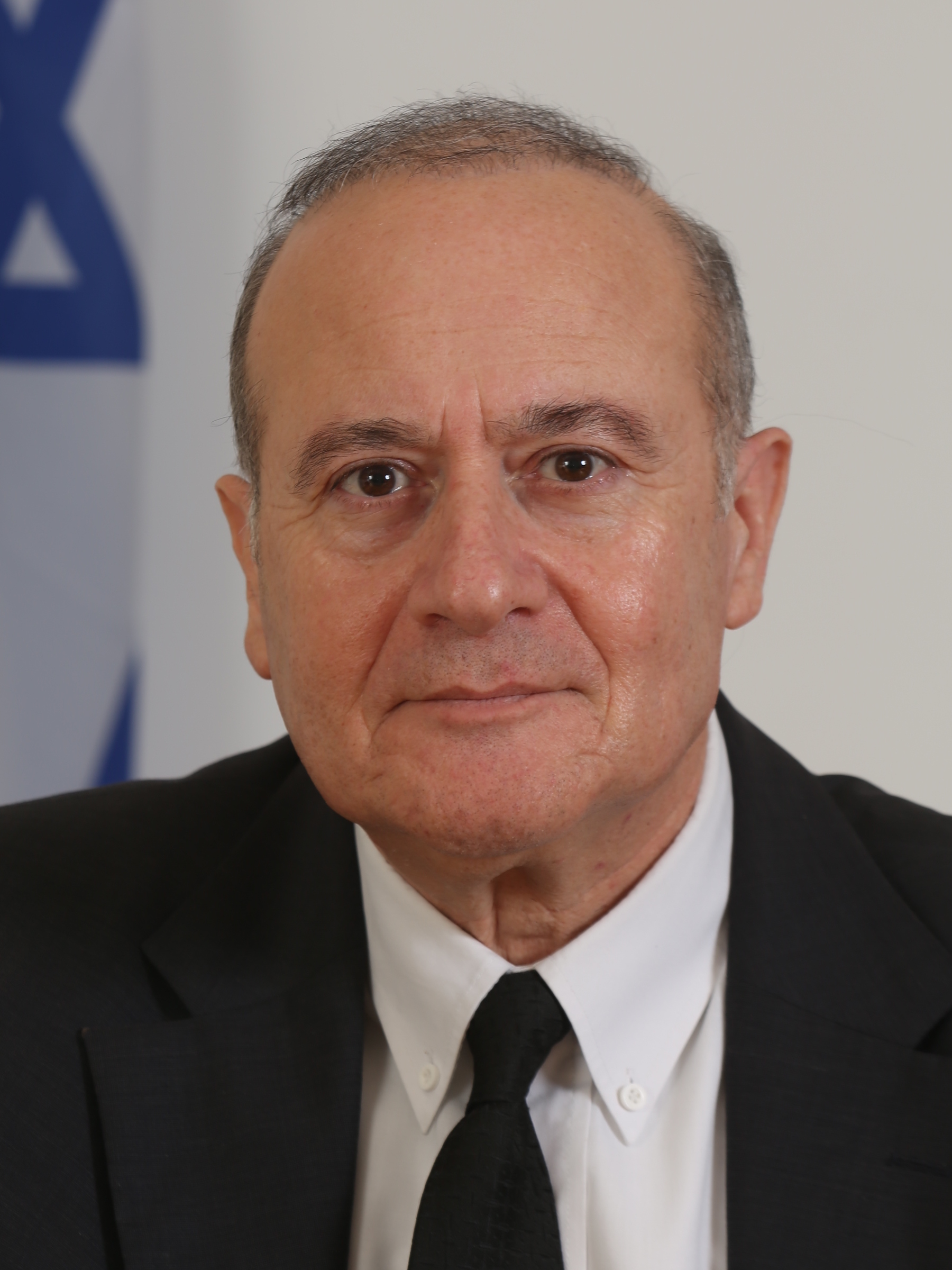

Justice of the Supreme Court of Israel
- In office 30 October 2017 – 18 September 2025
- Nominated by: Ayelet Shaked
- Appointed by: Reuven Rivlin

President of the Haifa District Court
- In office July 2013 – 30 October 2017
- Appointed by: Tzipi Livni

Judge of the Haifa District Court
- In office June 2003 – 30 October 2017
- Nominated by: Tommy Lapid
- Appointed by: Moshe Katsav

Judge of the Haifa Magistrate Court
- In office March 1994 – June 2003
- Nominated by: David Libai
- Appointed by: Ezer Weizmann

Personal details
- Born: 20 September 1955 (age 71) Haifa, Israel
- Education: University of Buckingham (LLB); Haifa University (MA)

Joseph Elron (Hebrew: יוסף אלרון, romanized: Yosef Elron, born 20 September 1955) is an Israeli jurist who served as a justice of the Supreme Court of Israel from 2017 until his retirement in 2025.

== Early life and education ==
Elron was born in Haifa, the youngest of nine children born to Ovadia and Tzadika Alfarih, Iraqi Jewish immigrants to Israel originally from Mosul. After graduating from "Erev Hadash" high school in Haifa, he served in the Israel Defense Forces from 1973 to 1977. After being discharged in 1977 with the rank of lieutenant, he moved to the United Kingdom. He worked in various security organizations from 1977 to 1980 and studied law at the University of Buckingham. After graduating with a Bachelor of Laws in 1983, he returned to Israel, where he clerked in a law firm and the Haifa District Attorney's Office. He completed a Master of Arts in National Security Administration at the University of Haifa in 2001.

== Legal career ==
After being admitted to the Israel Bar Association in 1985, Elron opened a law office in Haifa and practiced law as an attorney dealing in criminal and civil law from 1985 to 1994. In 1994, he was appointed a judge on the Haifa Magistrate's Court, and in 2003 was appointed a judge on the Haifa District Court. In 2010, while continuing to serve on the Haifa District Court, he was appointed a judge on the Military Court of Appeals as part of his military reserve duty, with the rank of lieutenant colonel. In 2012, he was appointed Deputy President of the Haifa District Court. The following year he was appointed President of that Court and served in this role for over four years (July 2013-October 2017). As a District Court judge and as the President of the District Court, he heard dozens of severe crime cases as the Chair of the judicial panel.

In addition, he took part in various committees aiming to improve and optimize the Israel judicial system: he chaired the Judicial Measurable Objectives committee, and served as a member of the Integration Committee of the Israel Judicial System Strategic Plan. He also served as a member of the judicial selection committee and between the years 2014-2018, he served as the Chairman of the Israel Bar Association's Examination Committee.

== Supreme Court ==
In February 2017, Elron was appointed a Supreme Court Justice. He assumed the position on 30 October 2017.

As a Supreme Court Justice, Elron often reiterates the importance of the relationship between the Courts and the individual citizen, for which "the encounter with the courts is, often, a charged and exciting encounter, and sometimes the most dramatic encounter in his life". In this context, he expressed concern of a great deal of distrust among the public in the judicial system, and stressed that the judicial system should strive to gain public trust, on which its legitimacy is based.

This general approach is rooted in his rulings in various fields of law, as he frequently strives to empower citizens who suffer mistreatment from government authorities. Particularly, Justice Elron ruled that police forces must avoid using excessive force while performing riot control against demonstrators.

Similarly, Elron criticized the use of prosecutorial authority in cases he deemed inappropriate for the criminal process. For example, in a case involving the prosecution of beggars near the Western Wall in Jerusalem's Old City, Elron dissented from the majority opinion that approved the government's actions, and argued that the criminal process is inappropriate for such cases and the government should solve the issue in other ways.

In a different case, Elron expressed the importance of public housing, and the emotional place that a home often occupies in one's life. Elron sided with the child of an occupier of an Amidar-Public-Housing unit, who was denied the right to continue living in his childhood home. Elron expressed the existential place that a house, especially one lived in for long time, has in a person's life.

Elron was also among the judges who ordered the Ministry of Education to subsidize school-transportation for children with special needs, citing the duty that the public and the state owe to the integration of persons with special needs in the general public sphere.

Elron also set on the panel that adjudication a civil action by Yemeni Jewish families, who argued that their children were taken away from them by the Israeli government in the early years of the state, and demanded compensation. Elron ruled that the systematic disappearance of children raises, prima facie, a cause for action, and that the families may file a joint suit, so as to reduce their financial burden in adjudicating the matter.

In a case involving the compensation for Holocaust survivors from Germany, Elron argued in a dissent that their cases should be subjected to a reduced burden of proof.

In a petition involving the constitutionality of separated academic programs for males and females, he decided that such petitions should not be deemed prima facie unconstitutional. Elron stated that such programs allow members of the Ultra-Orthodox to take part in higher education, in a manner which will facilitate their participation in the labor sector and in society at large. At the same time, Elron stressed that such programs cannot come at the expense of females in academia, and universities need to facilitate their participation in educating and lecturing in separated-programs as well.

In a petition surrounding the translation of Bagrut (matriculation) exams into the Arabic language for Arab students, Elron stated that the Ministry of Education has a duty to ensure that Arab students are not discriminated against compared to Jewish students, and have equal access to education - including the ability to be tested in their native language. In a different case, he reiterated the right of Arab students to study in their native language, and the duty of municipal authorities to check whether their residents are interested in access to such services. In a case involving the approval of a municipal construction-planning program, Elron reiterated the importance of allowing Arab citizens to participate in the planning discussion, including holding some of the deliberations in the Arabic language so as to allow them meaningful participation.

Elron also chaired a committee that examined the interactions between judges and attorneys in legal proceedings relating to criminal investigations, before indicting a suspect. The Committee's conclusions underscored, among other things, the importance of transparency in legal proceedings. These later contributed to the formulation of new Rules of Conduct, which came into force during September 2018, and wished to provide comprehensive guidelines for the proper nature of the interactions between judges and attorneys.

During his tenure in the Court, Elron has become recognized with his rulings in Criminal Law, expanding the rights of the accused and criticizing government overreach. Elron's support for civil liberties in the Criminal Process often landed him in the dissent.

In one case, the Court, in an expended panel, considered whether defendants were entitled to challenge the reasonableness of prosecutorial conduct, as well as raise similar administrative-law challenges during their criminal trial. Elron was the sole judge (in an 7 to 1 opinion) who thought that such challenges should be allowed, arguing that criminal prosecution should not be treated differently than other administrative actions. In contrast, the majority ruled that administrative challenges do not belong within the framework of the criminal trial

In another case, the Court considered whether warrants for search of electronic devices should be granted in ex-parte proceedings or with the presence of defense counsel. Elron was the sole dissenter (in a 8 to 1 opinion), arguing that defense counsel should be present in such proceedings, while the majority ruled that only the prosecution should be present in them. Furthermore, Elron also argued that search of electronic devices should only be done by warrant, and even the owner's consent cannot cure a warrantless search.

In yet another case, Judge Elron criticized the prosecution for not transferring all relevant investigative materials to the defendant. He ruled that such misconduct might justify granting the defendant permission to withdraw his confession to the offenses attributed to him.

Recently, Elron ruled that the government is not allowed to conduct searches in airports for illegal countermand and substances without probable cause, and that the singling out of persons based on allegedly irrelevant factors such as race or sexual orientation would render evidence gathered in such searches inadmissible.

Elron's prominence as a judge concentrated in Criminal Law materialized in his expansion on a 2019 legislative amendment, which restructured the homicide offenses in Israeli law. Among others, Elron elaborated on the different offenses created by the amendment, ruling that the amendment was intended to differentiate between "basic" murder act (similarly to second degree murder in the common law countries), and murder done in "aggravating circumstances" (similarly to the common law's first degree murder). Elron argued that the courts should yield to the legislature's decision to differentiate between the two types of murder, and that the "aggravating circumstances" should not be interpreted too broadly so as to include virtually any murder.

Alongside this, Justice Elron does not spare criticism on the lengthiness of criminal proceedings while the defendant is in custody. In this context, he often orders the courts to speed up the hearings and bring the proceedings to an end. In several watershed decisions, he clarified that extradition requests do not automatically establish grounds for arrest. Nevertheless, when approving the extradition requests, he often underscores that Israel should not provide shelter for criminals and stresses that when the conditions for extradition are met, it should be carried swiftly.

At the same time, Justice Elron espouses a conservative jurisprudence. He routinely emphasizes that "the court reviewing an administrative decision does not replace the administrative authority's discretion in making its own decision, and does not interfere with the decision even if a better decision could be made." Recently, Elron criticized what he sees as judicial overreach into the affairs of the political branches, arguing that the current Court's jurisprudence has made any legislative act a "conditional law", which is only granted full force after the judicial branch has reviewed the law and found it constitutional. For Elron, this practice undermines the balance of power between the branches of government, where legislative acts should only be invalidated in extreme cases where basic human rights are at risk. Additionally, Elron stressed that the court should avoid practicing judicial review in disputes between the legislative and executive branches, and at any rate, not intervene before allowing an adequate opportunity to resolve such disputes amicably. To that end, Elron opposed judicial interference into the Prime Minister's Cabinet nominations, arguing for increased deference between the branches of government.

Another aspect of this conservatism is found in Elron's relatively harsh sentencing approach. Among other cases, Elron dissented from the majority opinion in a sentencing case of a young adult who was accused of sexual assault of a fellow classmate. Elron argued that despite his age, the perpetrator should be sent to prison, and not only receive probation. Similarly, Elron fiercely denounced violence against females, ruling that offenders should be sentenced to lengthy prison times.

In one case, Justice Elron ruled that the Court should not overturn the Attorney General's decision not to prosecute General Security Services Interrogators for torture. Elron found that the petitioners failed to prove that the security services practiced violent measures against the interrogated suspect; and that the "special measures" practiced by the Security Services were necessary for the immediate thwarting of "a tangible threat of harm to human life". The ruling also rejected the petition for cancellation of the Security Services directive, allowing investigators to consult with senior officials about their use of "special measures" during the interrogations. Supreme Court Chief Justice Esther Hayut rejected the request for further hearing on the ruling.

Justice Elron rejected a petition against the Foreign Ministry's policy to allow leaders who allegedly participated in crimes against humanity and war crimes to visit at Yad Vashem Museum. He emphasized that various considerations may support this policy since one of the objectives of Yad Vashem to convey an educational lesson for future generations and discourage leaders from committing such crimes.

In September 18, 2024, Elron retired from the Court, reaching the mandatory retirement age. During the retirement ceremony, Elron elaborated on his path in the judicial system and his judicial approach, also reading his final ruling: a decision granting parents the right to counsel in child protection committees that have the authority to revoke custody.

== Post-judicial activities ==
=== Candidacy for State Comptroller ===
Following his retirement from the Supreme Court, Elron announced his candidacy for the office of State Comptroller ahead of the expiration of State Comptroller Matanyahu Englman's term in July 2026. His candidacy received support from both coalition and opposition lawmakers. In the first round of voting, held in the Knesset on 3 June 2026, Elron received 60 votes, defeating attorney Michael Rabello, who received 57 votes. As the State Comptroller Law requires an absolute majority of at least 61 members of Knesset, a second round of voting was held.

During the second round, reports emerged that members of the Likud faction had been instructed to photograph their ballots behind the voting booth in order to prove that they had voted for Rabello. Although the Knesset's legal advisers had prohibited both the introduction of mobile phones into the voting booth and the photographing of ballots, several lawmakers documented and publicized their votes. Amid concerns that the secrecy of the ballot had been compromised and that undue pressure had been exerted on legislators, the vote was halted and the second round was repeated. Rabello ultimately won the repeated second round with 61 votes and was elected State Comptroller. On 2 July 2026, the High Court of Justice invalidated the election, ruling that the requirement of a secret ballot had been violated.

== Works ==
- Yosef Elron, The Contribution of the Jurisprudence of the Supreme Court to the Protection of Social Rights, in JUDICIAL INDEPENDENCE: CORNERSTONE OF DEMOCRACY 66 (Shimon Shetreet & Hiram E. Chodosh eds., 2024).
- Yosef Elron, The status of Amendment 113 to the Penal Law following the 6621/23 State of Israel v. Green, Meni Mazuz Book (Yoram Rabin, Yaniv Vaki and others eds. 2026).
- Yosef Elron, Making Sharia Court Rulings Accessible – Its Importance and Virtues, Kadat VeKadin 2 (2025).
- Yoself Elron, On Judicial Discretion in Times of War, Individual Rights, State Security – and Everything in Between, Rashut Harabim (2025).
- Yosef Elron "Criminal Law – at a Crossroads" published in the book honoring Supreme Court Justice Salim Joubran (2023).
- "Procedural Rights in Criminal Law – Between Public Law Principles and Considerations of Justice" published in issue 49 of "The Lawyer" ("Orech Ha'din").
- Opposing Psychiatric Opinions – The Considerations Underlying the Judicial Decision in APPLIED ISSUES IN LEGAL PSYCHOLOGY (Probook Publishing House, 2011): In this article, Elron offered several rules of thumb to decide between conflicting psychiatric opinions, and demonstrated them through court rulings on the matter.
- Probation Survey and Victim Survey: Legal and Ethical Considerations in ISSUES IN PSYCHOLOGY, LAW AND ETHICS IN ISRAEL, DIAGNOSIS, TREATMENT AND JUDGMENT (Diunon Publishing House, 2008): In this article, he discussed the difficulty of making the content of the reports in the course of the criminal proceedings public, and suggested, among other things, that the authors of the reports and the professional opinion expressed their views on the matter when submitting their reports.
- Acceptance of Evidence not under Law Procedure ADI AZAR'S BOOK – 12 HAMISHPAT (2007): In this paper, Elron discussed the legal framework for submitting evidence of non-compliance with a focus on criminal law, and suggested that in deciding the trial court's decision to allow further non-timely evidence, it would consider the standards that guide the appeals Court.
- The Investigating Judge Under the Investigation of Causes of Death Law, 5718-1958 SHAMGAR'S BOOK – Articles, Part II (The Israel Bar Association Publishing House, 5763-2003): In this article, he reviewed the court rulings concerning the cause of death investigation by a judge, and discussed the increasing use of this procedure and the application of the existing law.
- On the Cornerstones of sentencing homicide offenses following Amendment 137, Hendel Book (Alex Stein Ed.): The article examines the implementation of sentencing rules (Amendment 113) on the new homicide offenses enacted through the Homicide Acts Reform, also discussing the rules set by the Supreme Court for several issues concerning the punishment of the "basic" homicide offense. The article examines potential issues expected to arise in upcoming litigation.
