= Mandy Sand =

Israeli artist (1932–2004)

- Born: Mandy Sandulovici; November 1932; Bucharest, Romania
- Died: December 2004 (aged 72); Netanya, Israel
- Citizenship: Israeli
- Education: Școala Populară de Artă, Bucharest
- Movement: Surrealism, Fantastic realism
- Spouse: Agnes Sand

Mandy Sand (born Mandy Sandulovici; 1932–2004) was an Israeli painter and graphic artist. He is known for his contributions to the genres of Surrealism and Fantastic realism, with his works featured in art collections and international exhibitions, including Italy, France, Germany, and North America.

== Biography ==
Born in Bucharest, Romania, in 1932, Sand began painting at age 11 and completed his artistic training at the Școala Populară de Artă in Bucharest under the guidance of Radu Bedivan in 1964. He immigrated to Israel the same year and settled in Netanya. While working in the local industry to support his family, he continued to develop his artistic career from his home studio. In a 1969 review in the daily Maariv, the prominent critic and illustrator Kariel Gardosh (Dosh) described Sand as an established artist, praising his technical transition into Fantastic Realism.

== Artistic style and themes ==
Sand's work merged classical techniques with dream-like imagery. Art critic Gil Goldfine frequently analyzed Sand's technique, describing him as a "technician skilled in the classical art of glazing," and noting his ability to create "surreal, disturbing, yet fascinating images" using oil and mixed media. After an exhibition in 2001 at the Artists Pavilion in Tel Aviv, Goldfine described the nine section wall installation Visions as somewhere between grotesque baroque decoration and fantastic realism, which could be compared to the French symbolist Gustave Moreau: "Although much of Sand's work borders on narrative kitsch, one must give him credit for determination and sometimes-adequate figurative rendering. His entire enterprise is an uncompromising collection of psychedelic colors describing characters and stage props in a theater of the absurd."

Throughout his career, Sand explored classical, philosophical, and biblical themes. In 1991, he presented "Homage to Rembrandt," an exhibition reinterpreting the Old Master's self-portraits. This landmark exhibition was officially sponsored by the Royal Netherlands Embassy in Israel and was opened by the Dutch Cultural Attaché. In 1993, he exhibited a significant series of works inspired by the biblical Song of Songs.

== Legacy and Media ==
In June 1984, Sand was the subject of a national television profile titled "Self-Portrait of Mandy Sand," broadcast on Israel's Channel 1 as part of its "Art Magazine" program. His 1988 exhibition at the Netanya Cultural Center was opened by Mayor Yoel Elroi, highlighting his standing in the local cultural community.

In May 2017, a retrospective exhibition titled "Journey to the Subconscious" was held at Heichal HaTarbut in Netanya, featuring 21 of his works across various media.
