= Yoram Elron =

Israeli diplomat

Personal details
- Born: February 24, 1960 (age 66) Italy
- Children: Dori Elron, Inbar Elron
- Occupation: Ambassador

Yoram Elron (Hebrew: יורם אלרון; born 24 February 1960) is an Israeli diplomat who has been the ambassador of the State of Israel to the Republic of Moldova since April 2025. He previously served as Ambassador of Israel to Bulgaria from 2019 to 2023 and held senior positions in Israel’s Ministry of Foreign Affairs, including Head of the Africa Division.

== Biography ==
Yoram Elron was born in Rome and grew up in Jerusalem. He served in the IDF between the years 1978 and 1981 in the artillery brigade and took part in the first Lebanon war in 1982. He received his BA in International Relations from the Hebrew University of Jerusalem where he also earned his MA in Political Science.

== Diplomatic Career ==
Elron joined Israel’s Ministry of Foreign Affairs in 1988. Previously, he worked as a research assistant in the Political Sciences Department of the Hebrew University of Jerusalem and as a coordinator in the Department of Visiting Journalists at the Government Press Office.

His early diplomatic assignments included service in the Ministry’s Economic Division, West European Division, as spokesperson at the Israeli mission to the European Union in Brussels and as counselor at the Israeli embassy in Denmark.

From 2000 to 2003, Elron served as Israel’s ambassador to Cameroon, Gabon, Equatorial Guinea, the Republic of Congo and the Central African Republic. He subsequently served as Director of the East African Division and Acting Deputy Director General for Africa at the MFA headquarters.

From 2007 to 2011, Elron served as Consul General of Israel to Quebec and the Atlantic Provinces and as Israel’s Permanent Representative to the International Civil Aviation Organisation (ICAO) in Montreal.

From 2012 to 2015, Elron served as roving ambassador to Madagascar, the Democratic Republic of the Congo and Gabon.

From 2015 to 2019, he was Deputy General for Africa. During his tenure relations with the African continent were expanded and strengthened. He accompanied the Prime Minister of Israel on four trips including to Chad during which time diplomatic relations were restored.

Elron was Ambassador of Israel to Bulgaria from 2019 to 2023. In July 2023, Bulgarian President Rumen Radev awarded Elron the Order of the Madara Horseman, First Degree, for his contribution to enhancing relations between the two countries.

In January 2025, the Government of Israel approved Elron’s appointment as Ambassador of Israel to Moldova. He subsequently became Israel’s first resident ambassador in Chisinau in April of that year, and presented his credentials to President Maia Sandu in September 2025.

== Personal Life ==
Yoram is married to Vered Rosa Elron and has two children, Dori and Inbar.
