= Ellie =

- Pronunciation: /ˈɛli/
- Gender: Unisex
- Language: English

Origin
- Languages: Ancient Greek and other languages
- Origin: Diminutive form of several names beginning with El-
- Meaning: "Ellinis" Hellenic, and others
- Region of origin: English-speaking world

Other names
- Variant forms: Elly; Elli
- Related names: Elizabeta, Elvira, Elaine, Eleanora, Eliora (given name), Elena, Ellisha, Elisha, Elesha, Elnaz, Elham, Eliana, Elisabel, Elisabeth, Élisabeth, Elisabetta, Elise, Michelle, Élise, Elisa, Elisheba, Elisheva, Ellinor, Elmira, Elissa, Eliza, Elizabeth, Elize, Shelly, Shelley, Eloise, Elspeth, Emelia, Petronella, Pieternella, Eleazer, Elliot, Elron, Elston, Elinor, Éilís, Eliška, Ellis, Eliseo, Elishama, Elrod, Amelia

Ellie or Elly is a given name. It is often short for Elizabeth, Eleanor, Elvira, Elaine, Elena, Eliora / Eliorah, Michelle, Elnaz, Amelia, Elham, Elaheh, Eliana, Eloise, Emelia, Elisa, Ellisha, Elisha, Elesha, Shelly, Eleni, Petronella, Eleazer, Elliot, Ellis, Eliseo, Elishama, Elrod, Elron, or Elston. In Greek mythology, Ellie (Helle) was the daughter of Athamas and Nephele; sister of Phrixus.

Notable people with the name include:

== Women ==
- Elly Akira, Japanese pornographic actress and model
- Ellie Aldridge (born 1996), British sailor
- Ellie as Méav Ní Mhaolchatha, Irish sister singer
- Elly Ameling (born 1933), Dutch soprano
- Ellie Anderson (born 2003), English cricketer
- Elly Appel-Vessies (1952–2022), Dutch tennis player
- Ellie Baker (born 1998), British athlete
- Elly Baker, British politician
- Ellie Bamber (born 1997), English actress
- Elly Barnes, English activist
- Ellie Beaven (born 1980), English actress
- Ellie Beer (born 2003), Australian sprinter
- Elly Beinhorn (1907–2007), German pilot
- Ellie Black (born 1995), Canadian artistic gymnast
- Ellie Blackburn (born 1995), Australian rules footballer
- Elly Blanksma-van den Heuvel (born 1959), Dutch politician
- Ellie Boatman (born 1997), English rugby union player
- Ellie Boldman (born 1975), American attorney and politician
- Elly Botbijl (born 1940), Dutch fencer
- Ellie Brazil (born 1999), English association footballer
- Ellie van den Brom (born 1949), Dutch speed skater
- Ellie Brush (born 1988), Australian association footballer
- Elly Bulkin, American writer
- Ellie Cachette (born 1985), American technology executive, activist and author
- Ellie Campbell, British singer
- Ellie Carpenter (born 2000), Australian footballer
- Ellie Challis (born 2004), British Paralympic swimmer
- Ellie Chowns (born 1975), British politician
- Ellie Cohanim (born 1972), American broadcast journalist
- Ellie Cole (born 1991), Australian Paralympic swimmer and wheelchair basketball player
- Elly Cordiviola (1940–2024), Argentine ichthyologist
- Ellie Cornell (born 1963), American actress and movie producer
- Ellie Coster (born 1996), Welsh cyclist
- Ellie Crisell (born 1976), British journalist and television presenter
- Ellie Crowe, author
- Ellie Curson (born 1994), Welsh footballer
- Ellie Dadd (born 2005), English actress
- Elly Dammers (1921–2009), Dutch javelin thrower
- Ellie Daniel (born 1950), American swimmer
- Ellie Darcey-Alden (born 1999), English actress
- Ellie DeGarmo (born 1994), American lacrosse player
- Ellie Dehn, American soprano
- Elly Dekker (born 1943), Dutch physicist and museum curator
- Ellie Diamond (born 1998), Scottish drag performer
- Ellie Dickinson (born 1998), British cyclist
- Ellie Dixon, English musician
- Elly Donald (born 1997), Australian cricketer
- Ellie Downie (born 1999), British artistic gymnast
- Ellie Drennan (born 1998), Australian singer-songwriter, youngest winner of The Voice Australia
- Ellie Dylan (born 1952), executive
- Ellie Falconer (born 1999), Australian cricketer
- Ellie Faulkner (born 1993), British swimmer
- Ellie Ga, American artist, writer and performer
- Ellie Gall (born 1996), Australian actress
- Ellie Gavalas (born 1996), Australian rules footballer
- Ellie Goldstein (born 2001), English model and actress
- Ellie Goulding (born 1986), British singer, songwriter and musician
- Ellie Green (born 2001), English rugby union player
- Ellie Greenwich (1940–2009), American pop singer, songwriter and record producer
- Ellie Greenwood (born 1979), British ultramarathon runner
- Elly Griffiths (born 1963), British author
- Elly Gross (1929–2022), Jewish Holocaust survivor and author
- Ellie Guggenheimer (1912–2008), American civic leader, author and philanthropist
- Ellie Haddington (born 1955), Scottish actress
- Elly Hakami (born 1969), American tennis player
- Ellie Hampson (born 2001), Australian rules footballer
- Elly Haney (1931–1999), American feminist theologian and community activist
- Ellie Harrison (artist) (born 1979), British artist
- Ellie Harrison (journalist) (born 1977), British journalist and presenter best known for her television wildlife work
- Ellie Harvie (born 1965), Canadian actress
- Elly Henes (born 1998), American athlete
- Elly Heuss-Knapp (1881–1952), German politician, social reformer, author and wife of German president Theodor Heuss
- Ellie Highwood, British climate scientist and academic
- Ellie Hill (born 1975), American politician
- Ellie Hisama, Japanese-American music theorist
- Ellie Holcomb (born 1982), American singer
- Ellie Hulsebosch (born 2007), New Zealand downhill mountain biker
- Elly van Hulst (born 1959), Dutch middle-distance runner
- Elly Hutton (born 1976), Australian sprinter
- Ellie Jackson (1825–1854), first wife of Thomas "Stonewall" Jackson
- Elly Jackson (born 1988), British singer, songwriter and the sole member of La Roux, a former synthpop duo
- Elly Jannes (1907–2006), Swedish writer and journalist
- Ellie Jean (born 1997), American soccer player
- Ellie Johnston (rugby league) (born 2000), Australian rugby league footballer
- Ellie Johnston (cricketer) (born 2003), Australian cricketer
- Ellie Jokar (born 1980), Danish rapper, comedian and actress sometimes credited as simply "Ellie"
- Ellie Junod (born 1993), Australian basketball player
- Ellie Kam (born 2004), American figure skater
- Ellie Kanner, American film and television director
- Ellie Karvoski, American rugby union player
- Ellie Kemper (born 1980), American actress, comedian and writer
- Ellie Kendrick (born 1990), British actress
- Ellie Kildunne (born 1999), English rugby union player
- Ellie Kinnaird (born 1931), North Carolina politician
- Ellie Kisyombe (born 1977), Malawian chef and human rights activist
- Elly Kjølstad (1850–1930), Norwegian stage actress
- Ellie Kleinheinz (born 2007), American Luger and three-time United States national championship
- Elli Kokkinou (born 1970), Greek singer
- Elly Koot (born 1943), Dutch model, Miss Europe 1964
- Elly Kouwenhoven (born 1949), Dutch author and politician
- Ellie Koyander (born 1991), British freestyle skier
- Ellie Krieger (born 1965), American nutritionist, author and host of the television show Healthy Appetite
- Elly Lam (born 1989), Hong Kong actress
- Ellie Lambeti (1926–1983), Greek actress
- Ellie Leach (born 2001), English actress
- Ellie Leather (born 1998), British runner
- Ellie Leek (born 1995), Welsh professional footballer
- Ellie Levenson (born 1978), British journalist and author
- Elly Lieber (1932–2020), Austrian luger, 1959 world champion
- Ellie Lust (born 1966), Dutch television presenter
- Ellie MacDowall, Scottish actress
- Ellie Mason (born 1996), Northern Irish footballer
- Ellie Mathews (born 1945), American author
- Elly Mayday (1988–2019), Canadian model
- Elly Mazlein (born 1980), Malaysian female singer, actress, host, comedian and radio presenter
- Ellie McCartney (born 2005), Irish swimmer
- Ellie McKenzie (born 2002), Australian rules footballer
- Ellie Miles (born 1999), English rugby union player
- Ellie Moon, Canadian-British actress, playwright and screenwriter
- Elly Nedivi, American neuroscientist
- Ellie Nesler (1952–2008), American vigilante
- Ellie Newton (1899–2003), Canadian traveler, poet and philanthropist
- Elly Ney (1882–1968), German romantic pianist
- Elly Niland, Guyanese writer
- Ellie Nunn, British actress
- Elly Nurachmah (born 1948), Indonesian nurse and university administrator
- Ellie Ochowicz (born 1983), American speed skater
- Ellie Pashley (born 1988), Australian long-distance runner
- Elly M. Peterson (1914–2008), American politician
- Elly Plooij-van Gorsel (born 1947), Dutch politician
- Ellie Posadas, Canadian actor
- Elly Pourasef, Iranian-American audiologist
- Ellie Price (born 1983), British television political journalist
- Ellie Rayer (born 1996), English ice hockey player
- Ellie Reed (born 1988), American actress
- Ellie Reeves (born 1980), British politician
- Ellie Robinson (born 2001), English Paralympic swimmer
- Ellie Roebuck (born 1991), English association footballer
- Ellie Rowsell (born 1992), English singer and musician
- Ellie Sanford (born 1997), Australian athlete
- Elly Schlein (born 1985), Italian politician
- Elly Schwab-Agallidis (1914–2006), Greek physicist
- Ellie Scotney (born 1998), English boxer
- Ellie Scott (born 2006), Northern Irish footballer
- Ellie Shaw (born 2008), Antiguan swimmer
- Ellie Simmonds (born 1994), British Paralympic swimmer
- Ellie Soutter (2000–2018), British snowboarder
- Elli Stai (born 1954), Greek journalist and TV presenter
- Ellie Stewart (born 1996), English footballer
- Ellie Stokes (born 2003), American-born Saint Kitts and Nevis footballer
- Ellie Stone (born 2001), British cyclist
- Elly Stone (1927–2020), American singer and actress
- Elly Tanaka (born 1965), American biochemist
- Ellie Taylor (born 1983), English comedian
- Ellie Tesher, Canadian journalist
- Elly Vilhjálms (1935–1995), Icelandic singer
- Elly de Waard (born 1940), Dutch poet
- Ellie Walbruch (born 2004), American soccer player
- Ellie Watton (born 1989), British field hockey player
- Ellie Wheeler (born 2001), American soccer player
- Ellie White (born 1989), English actress
- Ellie White (musician), Romanian singer
- Ellie Whiteaker, Australian politician
- Ellie Wilson (born 1997), English footballer
- Elly Winter (1898–1987), German communist and political activist
- Elly Yunara (1923–1992), Indonesian actress

== Men ==
- Elly (dancer) (born 1987), Japanese dancer and rapper
- Ellie Allen (1880–1966), Irish rugby union player
- Ellie Asieche (born 1991), Kenyan professional midfielder
- Elly De La Cruz (born 2002), Dominican Major League Baseball infielder
- Ellie Diamond (born 1998), Scottish drag performer
- Ellie Fredericks (1904–1993), American cinematographer
- Elly Gotz (born 1928), Lithuanian born, Holocaust survivor, educator and author
- Ellie Hendricks (1940–2005), American Major League Baseball catcher and coach
- Ellie Howard (1929–1980), American baseball player in the Negro leagues and Major League Baseball
- Elly Idris (born 1962), Indonesian football coach and former player
- Elly Ilias (born 1984), Malaysian motorcycle racer
- Elly Kadoorie (1867–1944), Jewish businessman and philanthropist in China and Hong Kong
- Elly Katunguka (born 1955), Ugandan veterinarian and academic administrator
- Elly Kayanja (born 1959), Ugandan brigadier
- Elly Kenner (born 1948), Israeli film editor, director and producer
- Elly Kitamireke (born 1931), Ugandan field hockey player
- Elly Kleinman (born 1952), American business executive and philanthropist
- Elly Lefort (born 1987), French and Monegasque bobsledder
- Ellie Mannette (1927–2018), Trinidadian musical instrument maker
- Elly Ochola (born 1983), Kenyan boxer
- Elly Ollarves (born 1981), Venezuelan sprinter
- Elly Pamatong (1943–2021), Filipino lawyer and politician
- Ellie Pringle (1910–1990), Canadian professional ice hockey player
- Elly Randriamampionona (born 1997), Malagasy basketball player
- Ellie Rodríguez (born 1946), Puerto Rican Major League Baseball catcher
- Elly Rono (born 1970), Kenyan long-distance runner
- Elly Rous, English football manager
- Elly Sabiiti, Ugandan professor
- Ellie Salkow (1953–2021), South African entrepreneur
- Elly Savatia (born 2001), Kenyan entrepreneur and innovator
- Ellie G. Shuler Jr. (1936–2024), United States Air Force lieutenant general
- Elly Tumwine (1954–2022), Ugandan general and politician
- Elly Wamala (1935–2004), Ugandan musician

== Fictional characters ==
- Elli, a character and bachelorette in the Story of Seasons video game franchise
- Ellie, a character in Greek mythology who figured prominently in the story of Jason and the Argonauts
- Ellegaard, a supporting character in Minecraft Story Mode (Referred to as Ellie for short)
- Ellie Arroway, the main character in Carl Sagan's science fiction novel Contact and the film based on it
- Eleanor Bartlet, the middle daughter of President Jed Bartlet on the television show The West Wing
- Elle Bishop, a character in American television series Heroes
- Ellie Rebecca Brass, on the American crime drama CSI: Crime Scene Investigation
- Elly May Clampett, a main character in the American television series The Beverly Hillbillies
- Eleanor Elly Conway, on the Australian soap opera Neighbours
- Ellie Craft, a.k.a. Onpu Segawa, in the anime series Ojamajo Doremi
- Eleanor Miss Ellie Ewing, on the American soap opera Dallas
- Ellie Fredricksen, in the 2009 Disney-Pixar animated film Up
- Ellie the Octopus, in Pajanimals
- Elly the Elephant, in Pocoyo
- Ellie, the protagonist of the cartoon Blender short film Sprite Fright and Leaf of Life.
- Ellie Linton, the protagonist of the novel Tomorrow When the War Began
- Ellie Miller, a main character on the television crime drama Broadchurch
- Eleanor Ellie Mills, on the British soap opera Hollyoaks
- Ellie Nash, in the Canadian television drama Degrassi: The Next Generation
- Ellie Riggs, the protagonist of the American sitcom Watching Ellie, played by Julia Louis-Dreyfus
- Dr. Ellie Sattler, in Jurassic Park
- Ellie Torres, a main character on the American television comedy Cougar Town
- Elly Van Houten, in the Xenogears video game
- Elinor "Ellie" Walker, from the 1960s television series The Andy Griffith Show
- Ellie Woodcomb, on the American series Chuck
- Ellie, a ghost in Elly & Jools, an Australian children's television series
- Ellie (The Last of Us), a main character from the video game The Last of Us
- Ellie Appleton, a character from the 2019 film Yesterday
- Ellie Phillips, a character from the video game Lego City Undercover
- Elektra "Ellie" Natchios, a character from the Marvel television series Daredevil
- Ellie, a character from the 2025 action thriller film Havoc, played by Jessie Mei Li
- Ellie, a character from the Ice Age franchise
- Ellie, a fictional character from the animated series Wylde Pak
- Ellie the Elephant, mascot for the WNBA basketball team the NY Liberty
- Ellie the Elephant, a fictional African elephant, originated in the Donkey Kong Country 3 video game

== See also ==
- Elle (disambiguation)
- Elli (disambiguation)
- Elly (disambiguation)
- Elie Rous (1909–?), English football manager, primarily in France
- Elie Wiesel (1928–2016), Romanian-born American Jewish writer, professor, political activist, Nobel Laureate and Holocaust survivor.
