= Elisha (given name) =

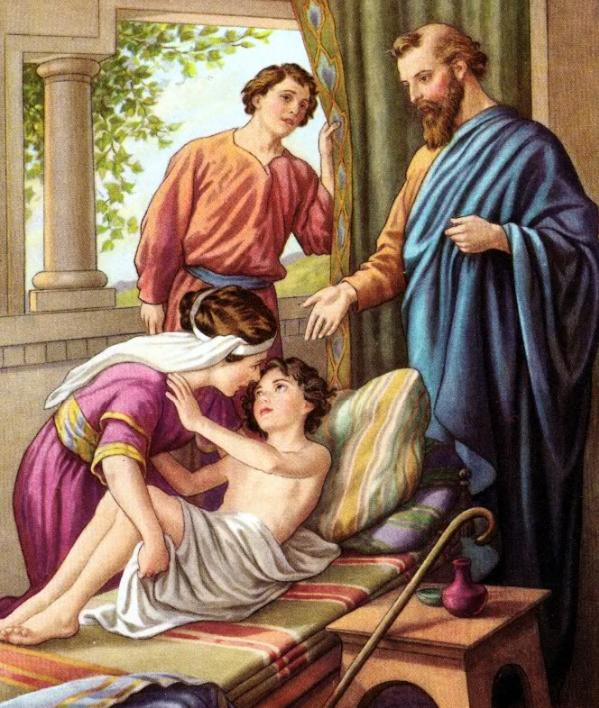
- Elisha raising the Shunammite's son, early 1900s Bible Card illustration
- Pronunciation: /ɪˈlaɪʃə/
- Gender: Unisex
- Language: English; Hebrew

Origin
- Language: Hebrew
- Meaning: "My God is salvation" or "God is my salvation"
- Region of origin: Kingdom of Israel (Samaria)

Other names
- Variant forms: Elishah; Elesha
- Short forms: Eli, Ellie
- Related names: Elisa, Eliseus, Eliseu, Elizeu, Eliseo, Elisei, Yeghishe

Elisha is a given name of Hebrew origin.

Elisha is a prophet in the Hebrew Bible, the Quran, and Baha'i writings.

Other persons with the same given name include:

== Actors ==
- Elisha Cook, Jr. (1903–1995), American actor
- Elisha Cuthbert (born 1982), Canadian actress
- Elisha Henig, American actor
- Elisha Kriis, Indian-American actress and television personality

== Businessmen ==
- Elisha S. Converse (1820–1904), American businessman
- Elisha Peck (1789–1851), American businessman
- Elisha Wiesel (born 1972), American chief information officer of Goldman Sachs; hedge fund manager of the Niche Plus; son of Elie Wiesel

== Inventors ==
- Elisha Gray (1835–1901), American electrical engineer considered by some to be the true inventor of the telephone
- Elisha Otis (1811–1861), American industrialist, founder of the Otis Elevator Company, and inventor of an elevator safety device

== Politicians and lawyers ==
- Elisha Hunt Allen (1804–1883), American congressman, lawyer and diplomat, and Chief Justice of the Kingdom of Hawaii Supreme Court and diplomat for the Kingdom of Hawaii
- Elisha W. Baily (1821–1904), American politician and physician from Pennsylvania
- Elisha Baxter (1827–1899), tenth Governor of Arkansas
- Elisha Cooke, Sr. (1637–1715), physician, politician, and businessman, elected Speaker of the Massachusetts House of Representatives
- Elisha Cooke, Jr. (1678–1737), physician and politician from the province of Massachusetts Bay; son of the above
- Elisha Dyer (1811–1890), American politician and 25th Governor of Rhode Island
- Elisha Dyer, Jr. (1839–1906), American politician and 45th Governor of Rhode Island; son of the above
- Elisha P. Ferry (1825–1895), twice Governor of the Washington Territory and the first Governor of the State of Washington
- Elisha Harris (1791–1861), 20th Governor of Rhode Island
- Elisha Krauss (born 1986), American journalist, speaker, and radio talk host based in Los Angeles, California
- Elisha Lewis (died 1867), American politician
- Elisha Litchfield (1785–1859), American merchant and member of the US House of Representatives from New York
- Elisha Mathewson (1767–1853), US Senator from Rhode Island
- Elisha McCallion (born 1982), Irish female Sinn Féin politician
- Elisha Payne (1731–1807), American businessman and politician
- Elisha Marshall Pease (1812–1883), fifth and thirteenth Governor of Texas
- Elisha Reynolds Potter (1764–1835), Federalist Party US Congressman and Speaker in the Rhode Island State Assembly
- Elisha R. Potter (1811–1882), justice of the Rhode Island Supreme Court and member of the US House of Representatives; son of the above
- Elisha Williams (1694–1755), Congregational minister, legislator, jurist and rector of Yale College

== Sportsmen ==
- Elisha King (born 1999), Australian rules footballer
- Archie Manning (born 1949), American former National Football League quarterback, born Elisha Archibald; father of Eli
- Eli Manning (born 1981), American former National Football League quarterback
- Elisha N'Dow (born 1996), English professional footballer
- Elisha Obed (1952–2018), Bahamian light middleweight boxer
- Elisha Sulola (born 2001), English professional footballer
- Elisha Scott (1893–1959), Irish association football goalkeeper
- Elisha Thomas (born 1981), American volleyball player
- Elisha Voren (born 1980), American taekwondo practitioner
- Elisha Williams (basketball) (born 1978), Canadian paralympic wheelchair basketball player

== Other ==
- Elisha ben Abuyah (before 70–?), Jewish rabbi and religious authority
- Elisha (Nestorian patriarch), patriarch of the Church of the East from 524 to 537
- Elisha Kent Kane (1820–1857), American explorer and medical officer
- Elisha Willis, English ballet dancer

== See also ==
- Elishah, a person in the biblical book of Genesis
- Elisa (given name)
