= Elli (given name) =

Elli is a feminine given name, often a diminutive or a variant of names beginning with El such as Eleanor, Elena, Elizabeth, Ella, Ellen or Ellie. It is also a modern Greek version of the name Helle. Elli is also the personification of old age in Norse mythology. It is also in use as an Icelandic masculine name of varying origins. Saint Elli was a sixth-century Welsh saint who is venerated by the Roman Catholic Church.

== People ==
- Saint Elli, a sixth-century Welsh saint
- Elli Alexiou (1894–1986), Greek author, playwright, and journalist
- Elli Barczatis (1912–1955), German executed for espionage in East Germany
- Elli Björkstén (1870–1947), Swedish-Finnish gymnastics coach and theorist
- Elli Burris (born 1989), American professional women's soccer player
- Elli Erl (born 1979), German singer-songwriter
- Elli Evangelidou (born 1968), Cypriot athlete
- Elli Hatschek (1901–1944), German Resistance member
- Elli Hemberg (1896–1994), Swedish abstract painter and sculptor
- Elli Ingram (born 1993), English singer-songwriter
- Elli Kokkinou (born 1970), Greek singer
- Elli Köngäs-Maranda (1932–1982), Finnish born anthropologist and feminist folklorist
- Elli (Helle) Lambridis (1896–1970), Greek philosopher
- Elli Leadbeater, British ecologist and evolutionary biologist
- Elli Marcus (1899–1977), German born American theater photographer
- Elli Medeiros (born 1956), French singer and actress
- Elli Norkett (1996–2017), Welsh women's rugby player
- Elli Ochowicz (born 1983), American Olympic speed skater
- Elli Overton (born 1974), Australian Olympic swimmer
- Elli Pappa (1920–2009), Greek writer and activist
- Elli Papakonstantinou, stage director, librettist, translator and activist
- Elli Parvo (1915–2010), Italian actress
- Elli Pikkujämsä (born 1999), Finnish footballer
- Elli Riehl (1902–1977), Austrian painter
- Elli Rose (born 1986), born Eri Arakawa, Japanese actress, fashion model and DJ
- Elli Saurio (1899–1966), Finnish economist
- Elli Schmidt (1908–1980), German communist political activist
- Elli Smula (1914–1943), German tram conductor imprisoned by the Nazis in a concentration camp, where she later died
- Elli Stai (born 1954), Greek journalist and television talk show presenter
- Elli Stamatiadou (1933–2015), Greek amateur botanist
- Elli Terwiel (born 1989), Canadian Olympic slalom skier
- Elli Tompuri (1880–1962), Finnish actress, director, dancer, and author
- Elli von Kropiwnicki, Austrian swimmer and competitor at the 1936 Olympic games
