= Dichoropetalum stridii =

Scientific classification
- Kingdom: Plantae
- Clade: Tracheophytes
- Clade: Angiosperms
- Clade: Eudicots
- Clade: Asterids
- Order: Apiales
- Family: Apiaceae
- Genus: Dichoropetalum
- Species: D. stridii

Binomial name
- Dichoropetalum stridii (Hartvig) Pimenov & Kljuykov

Species of flowering plant

Dichoropetalum stridii is a perennial flowering plant in the family Apiaceae, endemic to NW Greece. It occurs in pastures, rocky and gravelly places on ophiolithic substrates and occasionally on schist. It is flowering from July until August. It was first collected by Elli Stamatiadou and the holotype is stored at the herbarium of Goulandris Natural History Museum (ATH). It was named after Arne Strid a Swede botanist, expert of the Greek flora.
