= Elley =

Elley may refer to:

== Geography ==
- German exonym for the village Eleja, Latvia

== People ==
=== Surname ===
- Chris Elley (born 1977), founder and current Director of Texas-based film production company Electro-Fish Media LLC
- Derek Elley, film critic
- John Elley (1764–1839), Governor of Galway, Colonel of the 17th Lancers, a British cavalry officer who fought with distinction in the Napoleonic Wars
- Reed Elley (born 1945), Baptist minister and Canadian politician

=== Given name ===
- Elley Bennett (1924–1981), Australian Aboriginal boxer
- Elley Duhé (born 1992), American singer and songwriter
- Elley-Ray Hennessy, Canadian actress

== See also ==
- Mildred Elley, private two-year college with campuses in Albany, New York and Pittsfield, Massachusetts
- Ellie (disambiguation)
- Elli (disambiguation)
