= Elin Falk =

Swedish gymnastics pioneer (1872–1942)

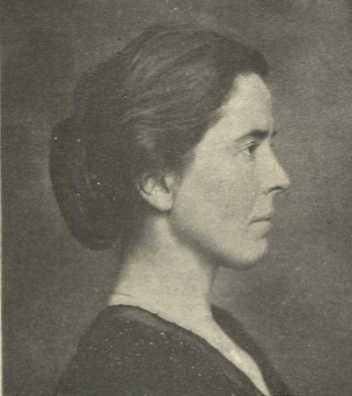
- Born: 16 January 1872; Vassända-Naglum parish, Västergötland, Sweden
- Died: 24 April 1942 (aged 70); Stockholm, Sweden
- Occupation: Swedish gymnastics director

Elin Falk (16 January 1872 – 24 April 1942) was a Swedish gymnastics director who revolutionised the teaching of the sport in the country's schools in the first half of the twentieth century.

== Early life and education ==
Elin Falk was born on 16 January 1872 in Vassända-Naglum parish in Västergötland. She attended a girls' school in Vänersborg for her secondary education, then studied at Harald Liedbeck's Institute of Gymnastics in Stockholm. She later continued her training at the Gymnastiska centralinstitutet (GCI) in Stockholm. She qualified as a gymnastikdirektör (director of gymnastics, a degree-level qualification) in 1895.

== Career ==
Falk spent the first four years of her career working abroad, initially as a gymnastics teacher and physiotherapist at the Young Women's Christian Association in Baltimore. She went on to hold similar positions in Britain and Denmark, before returning to Sweden in 1898. She then worked at Arwedson's gymnastics institute in Stockholm until 1909, before becoming a gymnastics inspector at public schools in 1910. She continued in this role until her retirement in 1932.

Falk was a key proponent and adapter of Lingian gymnastics in the early 20th century, expanding and evolving the number of exercises. Elli Björkstén introduced similar changes into women's gymnastics at the same time that Falk brought more rhythm and movement into children's gymnastics. Her work was sometimes at odds with the leading forces in Swedish gymnastics of the time. The publication of her book Gymnastikfrågan vid Stockholms folkskolor (The Gymnastics Issue in Stockholm's Primary Schools) in 1913 led to controversy in the conservative world of Swedish gymnastics.

Falk developed special exercises for children in schools, designed to be fun and engage with childhood energy. She also developed posture-straightening exercises. This contradicted the more military-oriented Swedish gymnastics taught elsewhere in Sweden at the time. She disliked the term "physical education" and emphasised the importance of the connection between the mental and the physical within the human body and its natural rhythms. Her daily exercises were put to the test at Stockholm's public schools. Some of the teachers, especially those who had been her pupils, were enthusiastic about implementing the exercises. Karolina Widerström, a leading Swedish woman gynecologist, was also supportive. Others wrote complaints to the School Board, wishing to return to the old exercises. Newspapers became involved, publishing condemnation of the exercises without having read about them. The director of Gymnastiska centralinstitutet penned a critical article, but Falk maintained her position. She was not diplomatic but was as critical of herself as of others, jettisoning any of her ideas which did not work as she had hoped.

== Publications ==
- Gymnastikfrågan vid Stockholms folkskolor (The gymnastics issue in Stockholm's primary schools), 1913.
- Dagövningar i gymnastik (3 volumes, 1913–1916)
- Gymnastik med lek och idrott (1927).

== Awards ==
Falk was awarded the Idun prize in 1916. In 1922 she was the recipient of the Gymnastikförbundets gymnastics association's golden merit award. In 1932 she was awarded Illis Quorum of the 8th degree.

== Death and legacy ==
Elin Falk died on 24 April 1942 in Oscar Parish, Stockholm, and was buried in Solna cemetery.

Falk's daily exercises are still used today. The gymnastics methods she implemented in Stockholm's primary schools have since been studied and adopted by educators from many countries. One of the first to take up her ideas and build on them was Maja Carlquist, who took the ideas around the world. Whilst Falk's innovative approach met opposition in her lifetime, she received recognition and appreciation posthumously.
