= Papakonstantinou =

Papakonstantinou (Greek: Παπακωνσταντίνου) is a Greek surname. It means "The Family of Father Constantine" (father referring to the priesthood). It is the surname of:

- Alex P Alexander "Alex P" Papaconstantinou, Greek-Swedish songwriter and music producer
- Anastasios Papakonstantinou (born 1963), Greek bobsledder
- Anthi Papakonstantinou (born 1995), Greek footballer
- Elli Papakonstantinou, stage director, librettist, translator and activist
- Giorgos Papakonstantinou (born 1961), Greek finance minister
- Michalis Papakonstantinou, (1919–2010), Greek politician, Minister for Foreign Affairs
- Thanassis Papakonstantinou (born 1959), Greek folk-rock singer and songwriter
- Theofylaktos Papakonstantinou (1905–1991), Greek journalist, writer and politician
- Vasilis Papakonstantinou (born 1950), Greek rock singer
- Frini Papakonstantinou, (born 1994), Greek educator
