= Elston (disambiguation) =

Elston is a village and parish in Nottinghamshire, England.

Elston may also refer to:

== Places ==
- Elston, Devon, a location in England
- Elston, Indiana, an unincorporated community in the United States
- Elston, Lancashire, a former parish in England, see Preston Rural District
- Elston, Missouri, an unincorporated community in the United States
- Elston, Wiltshire, a hamlet in England
- Elston, Queensland, the former name of Surfers Paradise, Queensland, Australia

== People ==
- Arnold Elston (1907–1971), American composer and educator
- Bill Elston (1897–1968), Australian football player
- Charles H. Elston (1891–1980), American lawyer and politician
- Darrell Elston (born 1952), American basketball player
- Don Elston (1929–1995), American baseball player
- Gene Elston (1922–2015), American baseball broadcaster
- John A. Elston (1874–1921), American politician
- Lindsay Elston (born 1992), American soccer player
- Michael Elston (born 1969), American lawyer
- Murray Elston (born 1949), Canadian politician and business executive
- Robert C. Elston (born 1932), English statistical geneticist
  - Elston-Stewart algorithm in genetics
- Tim Elston, Australian actor
- Elston Howard (1929–1980), American baseball player

== Other uses ==
- Elston Avenue, Chicago, United States
- Elston Hall, New York, United States
