= Jim Van Fossen =

American politician

James Van Fossen
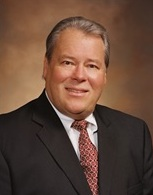

Member of the Iowa House of Representatives from the 84th district
- In office January 13, 2003 – January 7, 2007
- Preceded by: Brent Siegrist
- Succeeded by: Elesha Gayman

Personal details
- Born: Davenport, Iowa
- Party: Republican
- Spouse: Cathy
- Children: Jamie, 4 daughters

James Robert Van Fossen is a former Republican member of the Iowa House of Representatives, from the 84th district, first elected in 2002. Democrat Elesha Gayman defeated him in the Iowa House of Representatives elections, 2006. Van Fossen retired from the Davenport, Iowa police department in 2000 with the rank of Captain. His son, Jamie Van Fossen, is also a former member of the Iowa House, from the 81st district.

During his final term in the Iowa House, Van Fossen served on several committees - the Judiciary Committee, the Natural Resources Committee, and the Public Safety Committee, where he was vice chair. He also served on the Justice System Appropriations Subcommittee.

== Electoral history ==
*incumbent

Election	Political result	Candidate	Party	Votes	%
Iowa House of Representatives elections, 2002; District 84; Turnout: 9,450	Republican (newly redistricted)	Jim Van Fossen	Republican	5,090	53.9
Iowa House of Representatives elections, 2002; District 84; Turnout: 9,450	Republican (newly redistricted)	Patricia E. Zamora	Democratic	4,341	45.9
Iowa House of Representatives elections, 2004; District 84; Turnout: 15,009	Republican hold	Jim Van Fossen*	Republican	8,357	55.7
Iowa House of Representatives elections, 2004; District 84; Turnout: 15,009	Republican hold	Cammie Pohl	Democratic	6,646	44.3
Iowa House of Representatives elections, 2006; District 84; Turnout: 10,839	Democratic gain from Republican	Elesha Gayman	Democratic	5,429	50.1
Iowa House of Representatives elections, 2006; District 84; Turnout: 10,839	Democratic gain from Republican	Jim Van Fossen*	Republican	5,156	47.6

Iowa House of Representatives
Preceded by Brent Siegrist	84th District; 2003 – 2007	Succeeded by Elesha Gayman
