= Dichoropetalum alanyensis =

Scientific classification
- Kingdom: Plantae
- Clade: Tracheophytes
- Clade: Angiosperms
- Clade: Eudicots
- Clade: Asterids
- Order: Apiales
- Family: Apiaceae
- Genus: Dichoropetalum
- Species: D. alanyensis

Binomial name
- Dichoropetalum alanyensis Bilgili, Sağıroğlu & H.Duman, 2016

Species of flowering plant

Dichoropetalum alanyensis is a species of flowering plant in the carrot family from South Anatolia, Turkey. It is similar to Dichoropetalum chryseum.
