= Elly Lam =

Hong Kong actress (born 1989)

- 艾妮
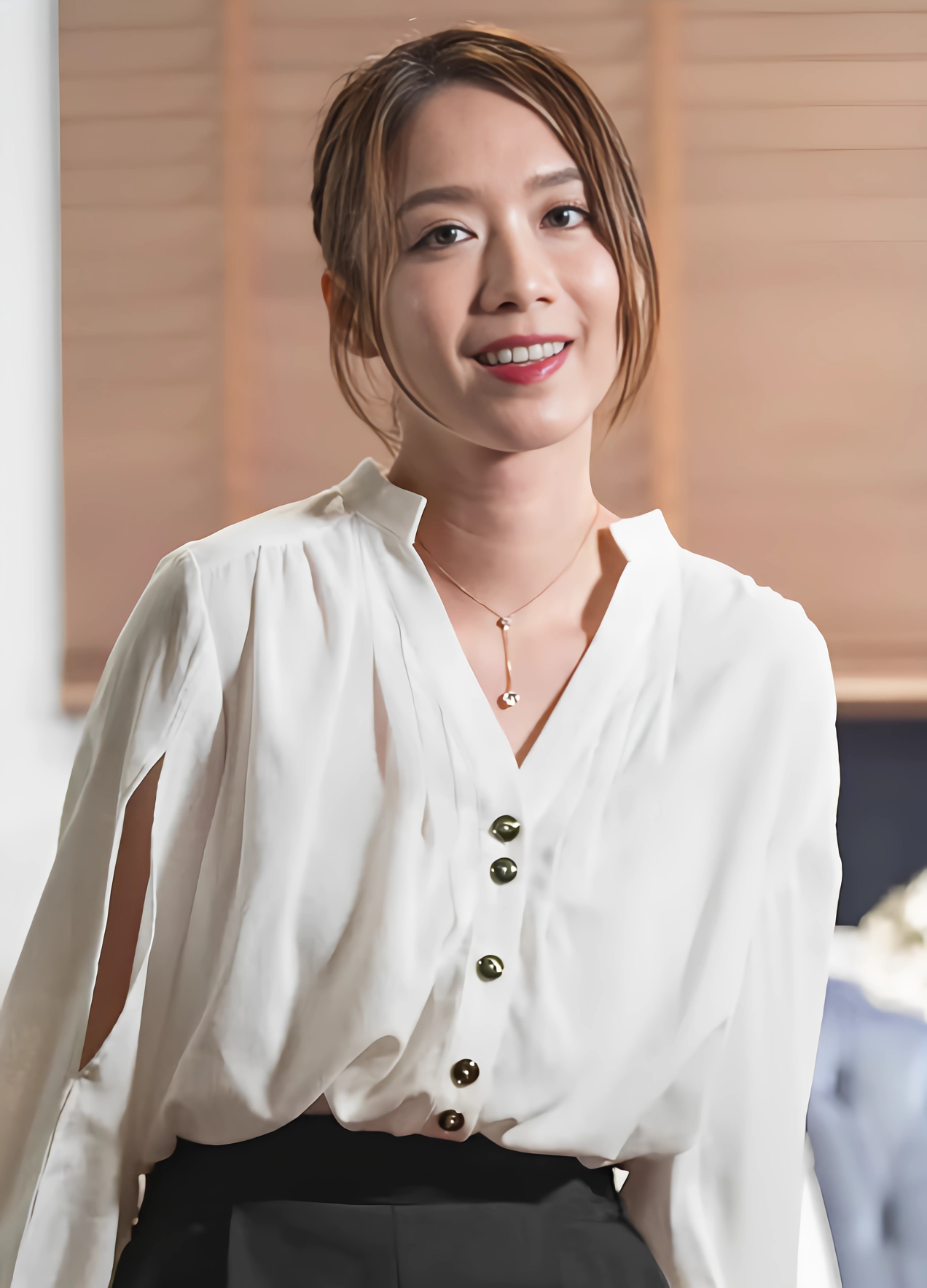
- Lam in September 2023
- Born: Lam Lai-sze (林麗詩)
- Other name: Dreamy Lam
- Education: SKH Bishop Mok Sau Tseng Secondary School; Hong Kong Polytechnic University – Bachelor of Nursing

Lam Lai-sze (Chinese: 林麗詩), also known as her stage name Elly Lam (艾妮) or Dreamy Lam, is a Hong Kong singer, actress, model and registered nurse. She was an artist of WSM Music Group Ltd. and currently an artist of Emperor Entertainment Group.

== Background ==
Elly Lam grew up in New Territories. Her elder sister is composer Lam Lai. She attended SKH Bishop Mok Sau Tseng Secondary School and served as the captain of the volleyball team while in school.

In 2011, she participated in "The Voice 3" (using her original name Lam Lai-sze at the time), but she was eliminated in the fourth round while studying in the third year of Nursing at the Faculty of Health and Social Sciences of the Hong Kong Polytechnic University. After graduating from university, she became a registered nurse and worked in operating rooms of several hospitals (elderly care, plastic surgery) for 6 years. In addition, she has also become a professional resident singer (Shangri-La Hotel), lead singer of a wedding band and a demo singer. She specializes in singing pop music and also loves to sing classical music.

In 2018, Lam released her first album "Dreamy", which was produced by Hi-Fi Records producer Ho Kwan-yuen. In mid-2019, she was invited to audition and officially signed with Emperor Entertainment at an event. In September 2020, she released her second Hi-Fi album "Closer", and 2,000 copies were printed. A German-made vinyl record version was also released.

Soon after, Elly Lam was affected by the COVID-19 pandemic, and a lot of her performing work was cancelled. She maintained her exposure by making videos through her personal YouTube channel.

Until the epidemic slowed down in 2023, she went to Tokyo to collaborate with Japanese music producers Masakazu Kimura and Jun Abe, and released her third personal Hi-Fi album "TOKYO BLOOM" in August.

== Performance works ==
=== Films ===
- 2023: Twelve Days played Flight attendant
