= Uncommon Friends of the 20th Century =

- Directed by: John Biffar
- Written by: John Biffar
- Produced by: John Biffar
- Narrated by: Walter Cronkite
- Distributed by: Bush Entertainment Inc.
- Release date: October 1, 1999
- Running time: 63 minutes
- Country: United States
- Language: English

Uncommon Friends of the 20th Century is a 1999 documentary film about Florida businessman James D. Newton and his wife Ellie Newton and the relationships they enjoyed with five key historic figures: Thomas A. Edison, Charles Lindbergh, Henry Ford, Harvey Firestone and Alexis Carrel. The film, which was directed by first-time filmmaker John Biffar and narrated by Walter Cronkite, included interviews with Newton (who was 94 years old at the time of production), archival footage and dramatic re-enactments.

The film had a brief theatrical release, and reviews were mostly negative. Lawrence Van Gelder, writing in The New York Times, called the film “a weak broth of biography, spiritual uplift and environmental concerns” and added “its generally uncritical and sometimes apologetic posture (Lindbergh's acceptance of a Nazi medal) and its failure to distinguish between its authentic film images and its re-enactments of events.” Nico Baumbach, writing in The Village Voice, stated that Newton's “anecdotes are so unspecific that his ostensible authority, the premise of the film, feels like a put-on.”

Uncommon Friends of the 20th Century was broadcast on public television in 2000. To date, the film has not been available as a commercial DVD release. However, copies of the film can be purchased from the Uncommon Friends Foundation, a nonprofit organization founded by James D. Newton that provides educational scholarships to business students.
