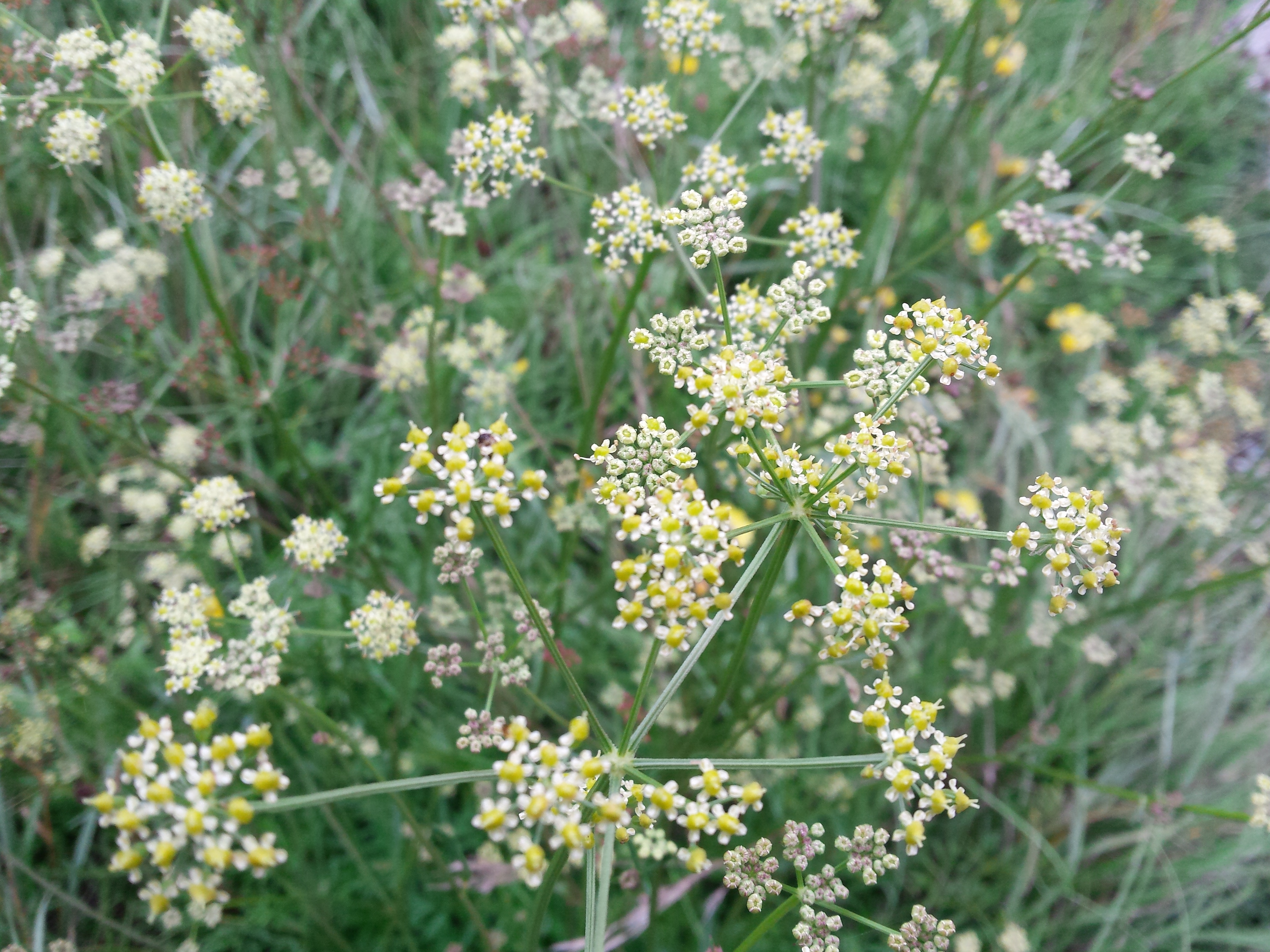
- Dichoropetalum carvifolia

Scientific classification
- Kingdom: Plantae
- Clade: Tracheophytes
- Clade: Angiosperms
- Clade: Eudicots
- Clade: Asterids
- Order: Apiales
- Family: Apiaceae
- Tribe: Selineae
- Genus: Dichoropetalum; Fenzl, 1842

Synonyms
- Chabrea Raf.; Holandrea Reduron, Charpin & Pimenov; Johreniopsis Pimenov; Schlosseria Vuk.

= Dichoropetalum =

Genus of flowering plants

Dichoropetalum is a genus of flowering plants in the carrot family.

The following species are accepted:

- Dichoropetalum achaicum (Halácsy) Pimenov & Kljuykov
- Dichoropetalum alanyensis Bilgili, Sagiroglu & H.Duman
- Dichoropetalum alpigenum (Boiss.) Pimenov & Kljuykov
- Dichoropetalum alpinum Fenzl
- Dichoropetalum aromaticum (Rech.f.) Pimenov & Kljuykov
- Dichoropetalum aureum (Boiss. & Balansa) Pimenov & Kljuykov
- Dichoropetalum bupleuroides Pimenov & Kljuykov
- Dichoropetalum carvifolia (Vill.) Pimenov & Kljuykov
- Dichoropetalum caucasicum (M.Bieb.) Soldano, Galasso & Banfi
- Dichoropetalum chryseum (Boiss. & Heldr.) Pimenov & Kljuykov
- Dichoropetalum depauperatum (Boiss. & Balansa) Pimenov & Kljuykov
- Dichoropetalum golestanicum (Rech.f.) Pimenov & Kljuykov
- Dichoropetalum graminifolium (Boiss.) Pimenov & Kljuykov
- Dichoropetalum isauricum (Parolly & Nordt) Pimenov & Kljuykov
- Dichoropetalum junceum (Boiss.) Pimenov & Kljuykov
- Dichoropetalum kittaniae (Yild.) Hand
- Dichoropetalum kyriakae (Hadjik. & Alziar) Hand
- Dichoropetalum lavrentiadis (Strid & Papan.) Pimenov & Kljuykov
- Dichoropetalum longibracteolatum (Parolly & Nordt) Pimenov & Kljuykov
- Dichoropetalum minutifolium (Janka) Pimenov & Kljuykov
- Dichoropetalum munbyi (Boiss.) Pimenov & Kljuykov
- Dichoropetalum oligophyllum (Griseb.) Pimenov & Kljuykov
- Dichoropetalum palimbioides (Boiss.) Pimenov & Kljuykov
- Dichoropetalum paucijugum (DC.) Pimenov & Kljuykov
- Dichoropetalum platycarpum (Boiss.) Pimenov & Kljuykov
- Dichoropetalum pschawicum (Boiss.) Pimenov & Kljuykov
- Dichoropetalum ramosissimum (Mozaff.) Pimenov & Kljuykov
- Dichoropetalum schottii (Besser ex DC.) Pimenov & Kljuykov
- Dichoropetalum scoparium (Boiss.) Pimenov & Kljuykov
- Dichoropetalum seseloides (C.A.Mey.) Pimenov & Kljuykov
- Dichoropetalum stridii (Hartvig) Pimenov & Kljuykov
- Dichoropetalum vittijugum (Boiss.) Pimenov & Kljuykov
- Dichoropetalum vuralii Özbek & Arslan

The following hybrid is accepted:

- Dichoropetalum × zirnichii (Cohrs) Reduron
