= Elrod =

Elrod may refer to:

- Elrod (surname), including a list of people with the name
- Elrod, Indiana, an unincorporated community
- Elrod, South Dakota, an unincorporated community
- Elrod, North Carolina, a census-designated place
