= Elly Sabiiti =

Ugandan Professor of Agricultural Science

Professor Elly Sabiiti
- Education: Makerere University University of New Brunswick
- Occupations: Academician, Scientist and Researcher

Elly Sabiiti is an Ugandan Emeritus Professor of Agricultural Science at the Department of Horticulture and Crop Science (HCS), School of Agricultural Sciences, College of Agricultural and Environmental Sciences, Makerere University. He was a former head of the department and a former dean of the faculty. He is an elected member of The World Academy of Sciences, the Vice President, East Africa of African Academy of Sciences and a recipient of the U.S. State Department's distinguished Fulbright Fellowship.

== Education ==
Elly Sabiiti obtained his Bachelor of Science and Masters of science in Agricultural Science from Makerere University. He moved to University of New Brunswick, Canada where he obtained his PhD in 1985.

== Memberships ==
In 2001, he was elected as member of The World Academy of Sciences and in 2006 he became a member of the African Academy of Sciences. Currently, he is the Vice president of African Academy of Sciences East Africa

== Research ==
He has contributed to the agricultural sciences through his research most is published in some of the globally recognized publishers. His work includes the following; Utilising agricultural waste to enhance food security and conserve the environment. Fire and acacia seeds: A hypothesis of Colonization Success. This study developed a conceptual diagram of germination success of A. sieberiana. Status of Waste Management in the East African Cities: Understanding the Drivers of Waste Generation, Collection and Disposal and Their Impacts on Kampala City's Sustainability. This study evaluated the drivers of waste generation, collection and disposal, and their impact on sustainability of Kampala as compared to the East African Community (EAC). Utilization of market crop wastes as animal feed in urban and peri-Urban livestock production in Uganda. This study found that transportation costs, contamination, lack of knowledge and the wastes not being free were the major challenges faced. A framework for assessing the Ecological Sustainability of Waste Disposal Sites (EcoSWaD). This article defined ecological sustainability for WDS and developed a framework for its assessment. Adaptation of EVIAVE methodology to landfill environmental impact assessment in Uganda :A case study of Kiteezi landfill. This study quantified the environmental impact of the Kiteezi landfill on the surrounding water bodies, soil, flora, fauna and air and identified suitable management options. Understanding the impacts of waste disposal site closure on the livelihood of local communities in africa: A case study of the kiteezi landfill in Kampala, Uganda. The article evaluated the Kiteezi landfill for its role in generating livelihoods for the local community and assessed the potential socioeconomic effects due to its closure. The impact of waste disposal sites on the local water resources: A case study of the Kiteezi landfill, Uganda. This article assessed the effectiveness of the leachate treatment process and the extent of water pollution by the leachate at the biggest sanitary landfill in East Africa, the Kiteezi landfill. Effects of inclusion levels of banana (Musa spp.) peelings on feed degradability and rumen environment of cattle fed basal elephant grass. The study established that banana peelings were better degraded than EG but higher BP levels negatively affected feed degradability and rumen environment. The role of fire in pasture and rangeland management. Effects of calving month, pasture conditions and management on the growth of Holstein-Friesian × Ankole crossbred calves in a semi-arid rangeland. The study established that suckling is beneficial for calves in semi-arid environments where seasonal pasture shortage regularly occurs. Role of credit in the uptake and productivity of improved dairy technologies in Uganda. Some important browse species as feed for livestock in East Africa. Parkia Biglobosa: A potential multipurpose fodder tree legume in West Africa. Fire behaviour and the invasion of Acacia sieberiana into savanna grassland openings. This study tested experimentally the effects of fire behaviour, using simulated and natural fuel loading conditions, on A. sieberiana seedling and sapling regeneration. Ecological studies on Macroptilium atropurpureum Urb. in Rwenzori National Park, Uganda. I. Effects of pre-treating seeds with concentrated sulphuric acid, scarification, boiling and burning on germination
