= Eliseo =

Eliseo, the Spanish or Italian form of Elisha, may refer to:

- Eliseo Alberto (1951–2011), Cuban-born Mexican writer, novelist, essayist and journalist
- Eliseo Castillo (born 1975), professional boxer
- Eliseo Grenet (1893–1950), Cuban pianist and a leading composer/arranger
- Eliseo Martín (born 1973), Aragonese Spanish long-distance runner
- Eliseo Medina (born 1946), labor activist involved in proposals for U.S. national immigration reform
- Eliseo Payán (1825–1895), Colombian lawyer, politician, and military officer
- Eliseo J. Pérez-Stable, Cuban-American physician-scientist
- Eliseo Quintanilla (born 1983), Salvadoran football (soccer) player
- Eliseo Rivero (born 1957), former Uruguayan footballer
- Eliseo Salazar (born 1954), racing driver from Chile
- Eliseo Soriano (1947–2021), Presiding Minister of the Members Church of God International until his death in 2021
- Eliseo Subiela (1944–2016), Argentine film director and writer
- Eliseo Valdés Erutes (born 1956), Cuban artist specializing in sculpture, painting, and drawing
- José Eliseo Salamanca (born 1979), Salvadoran professional soccer player
