= Ellie Newton =

Canadian traveler, poet, and philanthropist

- Born: Eleanor Napier Forde Newton; May 26, 1899; Montreal, Quebec, Canada
- Died: July 26, 2003 (aged 104)
- Education: McGill University

Eleanor Napier Forde Newton (May 26, 1899 – July 26, 2003) was a traveler, poet and philanthropist. Throughout her life, she developed friendships with many key figures of the twentieth century, including Thomas Edison, Henry Ford, Harvey Firestone, Charles Lindbergh, and Dr. Alexis Carrel. These friendships are described in the book Uncommon Friends: Life with Thomas Edison, Henry Ford, Harvey Firestone, Alexis Carrel, and Charles Lindbergh, authored by her husband, James ("Jim") Newton. Eleanor Newton was the first woman to join the Oxford Group and Moral Re-Armament, formed by American minister Frank Buchman. She received a Bible signed by Edison's wife, Mina Edison, which is now on display at Fort Myers Beach School.

== Early life ==
Eleanor was born in 1899 in Montreal, Canada. In 1916, she became Vice President of Westmount High School Literary Society. In the same year, she studied as a freshman at the Royal Victoria College, McGill University in Montreal, Canada. In 1917, her sister married Harris Whittemore, Jr. and moved to the United States. The following year, Eleanor, her mother, and her brother moved to New York City to live with her uncle, Milton Napier, and aunt, Annie Walker. In 1919, she started working as a secretary at New York University (NYU) School of Law.

On October 11, 1920, she decided to dedicate her life to God during an evening service at the Baptist Temple. In 1922, while taking courses as a staff member of NYU, she was granted a scholarship to attend Professor Frank Alvah Parsons' summer school program for art and design in Paris. Before her trip, Eleanor attended a service led by Sam Shoemaker and later worked with his group at Calvary Church. In 1924, Eleanor resigned from her position at NYU and became actively involved with the First Century Christian Fellowship, founded by Frank Buchman. It was also known as the Oxford Group, which was renamed the Moral Re-Armament (MRA) under Buchman's leadership in 1938. The MRA was an international moral and spiritual program designed to foster improved relations among governments and citizens worldwide. Buchman designed a strategy of holding "house parties" at various locations. Eleanor played a significant role and participated in those efforts by actively promoting and growing the movement. This period of her life was spent traveling throughout Europe, Africa, and North America as part of her MRA work.

== Marriage to Jim Newton, life in Fort Myers, and Uncommon Friends ==
Eleanor and her husband, James Draper Newton (1905-1999), were close friends of Anne Morrow Lindbergh and Charles A. Lindbergh. At the age of nineteen, James Newton became a real estate developer in Fort Myers, Florida. During this time, he became well acquainted with Thomas Edison, Henry Ford, and Harvey Firestone. In the 1920s, James participated in southwest Florida's real estate boom. He was the president of a company that developed 55 acres along McGregor Boulevard called "Edison Park". In 1928, he was hired by Firestone, where he served in various administrative positions. In the 1930s, Newton became increasingly involved in the Moral Re-Armament. He left Firestone in 1936 to work for the MRA full-time. By that time, Eleanor was a long-time teacher and leader in the MRA.

Newton guided the Lindberghs on boat trips through the Everglades and the Florida Keys and inspired their dedication to conserving the Florida environment. Charles Lindbergh served as the best man at James' and Eleanor's wedding in 1943. They played an active role in the MRA in the US and abroad, including working in India, Burma (now Myanmar), and the Caribbean as part of a nation-building program. In 1967, the Newtons retired from full-time work for MRA. They established a highly successful real estate development business in Fort Myers Beach. James Newton's book, Uncommon Friends: Life with Thomas Edison, Henry Ford, Harvey Firestone, Alexis Carrel & Charles Lindbergh, with a foreword by Anne Morrow Lindbergh, was published in 1987. A documentary based on the book, narrated by Walter Cronkite, was broadcast on public television in 1999.

Eleanor and James Newton received many awards for their contributions to community improvement projects, including the Edison and Ford estates' museum restorations. Their home on a beachfront named "Seven Seas" is now Newton Park in Fort Myers Beach. The Seven Seas served as a primary focus of Jim and Ellie's lives, as they lived, worked, and entertained there. Through their involvement in the MRA, internationally prominent individuals visited Seven Seas, including British tennis player "Bunny" Austin; Cardinal Konig; Frits Phillips, former chairman of the Philips electronics company; King Michael and Queen Anne of Romania, among others.

In 1993, friends of Newton founded the Uncommon Friends Foundation. This was created as a non-profit organization with a mission to foster character, integrity, and ethics throughout the region. The Uncommon Friends Foundation offers a curriculum for K-12 schools, extends ethics-enhancing services to regional organizations, and provides scholarships to students for institutions ranging from welding school to universities.

== Literary work ==
In 1986, Eleanor published Echoes from the Heart, a collection of poems. Her other works include the booklet The Guidance of God, published in 1937, and the pamphlet I Always Wanted Adventure: Experiences of the Life of Faith, published in 1992.
