= Eilish =

Éilis or Éilís (pronounced [ˈeːlʲəʃ] and [ˈeːlʲiːʃ] respectively), anglicized as Eilish or Eylish (/ˈeɪlɪʃ/ AY-lish or /ˈaɪlɪʃ/ EYE-lish), is an Irish given name.

Notable people with the given name include:

- Eilish Cleary (1963 – 2024), Canadian physician, health officer, and public health advocate
- Eilís Veronica Ferran (born 1962), Northern Irish solicitor, legal scholar, and academic administrator
- Eilish Collins Main, Irish-American politician
- Eilish McColgan, British athlete
- Eilish McSorley (born 1993), Scottish footballer
- Eilís Dillon, Irish writer
- Éilís Ní Dhuibhne, Irish writer
- Eilish Holton, Irish girl famous for being a conjoined twin, her sister Katie did not survive an operation that separated them

Notable people with the middle name include:

- Billie Eilish, American singer-songwriter
