= Elli (disambiguation) =

Elli is a personification of old age in Norse Mythology.

Elli may also refer to:

- Saint Elli of Wales
- Greek cruiser Elli, ships of the Hellenic Navy
- Elli-class frigate, a frigate class of the Hellenic Navy
- Battle of Elli, a sea battle of the First Balkan War
- "Elli", an MI5 mole and Soviet spy alleged to be Roger Hollis
- Elli, and electoral ward in Llanelli to Carmarthenshire County Council, Wales
- Elli, an album by Elli Medeiros
- Elli (given name), the usage of the given name

== People with the surname ==
- Alberto Elli (born 1964), Italian cyclist

== See also ==
- Ellis
