= Eliseo Valdés Erutes =

Cuban artist (born 1956)

Eliseo Valdés Erustes (born June 14, 1956 in Havana, Cuba) is a Cuban artist specializing in sculpture, painting, and drawing.

Valdés from 1973 to 1977, studied sculpture at the Escuela Nacional de Bellas Artes “San Alejandro”, in Havana, Cuba and from 1977-1982 studied at the Instituto Superior de Arte (ISA), in Havana, Cuba.

Valdés has exhibited his works in:

- 1983 - El Mito, el Hombre. Dibujos y Técnicas Mixtas at the Galería de Arte Galiano in Havana.
- 1984 - Pinturas y Esculturas at the Centro Provincial de Artes Plásticas y Diseño in Havana.
- 1989 - Elogio de las Sombras. (Para ciegos y débiles visuales.) at the Biblioteca Provincial de Cienfuegos in Cienfuegos, Cuba.
- 1997 - Leves crujidos de la materia at the Palacio del Segundo Cabo in Old Havana.
- 2000 - Violetas en la Sombra. Pinturas at the Fotomecánica Da’ Vinci de Cuba S.A. in Havana.
- 2003 - Expo Caribbean at the Hotel Horizontes Caribbean in Havana.
- 2003 - Arte en el Parque at the Museo del Chamizal, Ciudad Juárez, Mexico.
- 2003 - Pinturas at the Plaza Barrancas Cafe Rocco, Ciudad Juárez, Mexico.
- 2003 - Pinturas at the Centro Municipal de las Artes, Antigua Sala de Cabildo, Ciudad Juárez, Mexico.
- 2003 - Pinturas, Club Campestre Juárez, Ciudad Juárez, México.
- 2005 - Pinturas y Dibujos at the Edificio de Gobierno Prefectura de Gunma, Maebashi, Japan.
- 2006 - 25/50 at the Centro Cultural Cinematográfico ICAIC, Havana.

and has been part of collective expositions in:

- 1978 - Exposiciones de alumnos del Instituto Superior de Arte at the Facultad de Artes Escénicas del Instituto at the University of Havana.
- 1979 - Salón 13 de Marzo at the Galería L in Havana.
- 1980 - Salón Juvenil de Artes Plástica at the Museo Nacional de Bellas Artes de La Habana.
- 1981 - I Salón Nacional de Pequeño Formato. Salón Lalo Carrasco. Hotel Habana Libre. La Habana.
- 1981 - Exposición Después del Moncada. Centro de Arte 23 y 12.
- 1981 - Exposición Alumnos del ISA. Galería L.
- 1982 - Arte y Sociedad. Instituto Superior de Arte.
- 1983 - Exposición con motivo del I Simposio Internacional de Escultura Forma, Sol y Mar. Varadero.
- 1984 - Cultura Ambiental de la Revolución Cubana. En saludo al Día de la Cultura Cubana. Centro Provincial de Artes Plásticas y Diseño.
- 1984 - Esculturas Ambientales. En saludo al X Aniversario de la Constitución de los Poderes Populares. Ciudad de Matanzas.
- 1984 - Esculturas. Galería Servando Cabrera.
- 1985 - Exposición Pinturas y Esculturas. Centro Provincial de Artes Plásticas y Diseño.
- 1985 - Escultura ’85. FUNDARTE. Museo Ambiental de Caracas. Venezuela.
- 1986 - Formas bajo la luz. En saludo al Día de la Cultura Cubana. Galería La Habana.
- 1986 - Esculturas en tres tiempos. Galería Servando Cabrera.
- 1986 - Exposición Escultura Cubana Contemporánea. II Bienal de La Habana. Galería de Arte, Museo y Casa de la Cultura del Municipio 10 de Octubre.
- 1986 - Taller de Arte Actual de Julio L´Parc, Parque 14 esq. 15 Vdo. Ciudad de la Habana. II Bienal de la Habana
- 1987 - Exposición Colectiva de Escultura. Homenaje a Sandú Darié. Centro Provincial de Artes Plásticas y Diseño.
- 1992 - Semana de la Cultura Cubana, Hotel Barcelona- Sants. Barcelona. España.
- 1996 - Reflexionemos SIDA. Casa Benito Juárez. UNEAC – UNESCO.
- 1998 - Esculturas Homenaje. Casa de la Cultura de Plaza.
- 1998 - III Salón Nacional de Artes Plásticas, Varadero Internacional. Matanzas.
- 1999 - De Valigia in Cuba. Centro Provincial de Artes Plásticas y Diseño.
- 1999 - Simposio Internacional de Escultura Forma Sol y Cayo. Cayo Largo del Sur.
- 1999 - Obras para un Homenaje. Casa de la Cultura de Plaza.
- 2000 - Pequeña muestra de escultura cubana. Hotel Copacabana.
- 2000 - Sin fin, sin contén, sin medida. Centro de Desarrollo de las Artes Visuales.
- 2001 - “La Habana y www.melaocubanart.com”: espacios para soñar, el mito Galería Casa de Carmen Montilla.
- 2001 -“Arte Cubano de Hoy” exposición itinerante, Alemania.
- 2001 -“Tiempo Trascendente” exposición itinerante, España.
- 2002 – La Pequeña Gran Escultura. Museo Nacional de Bellas Artes. Habana. Cuba
- 2002 -“Otros Once”. Galería Concha Ferran
- 2002 -“Hemingway por siempre” Marina Hemingway, Ciudad de La Habana. Cuba PROYECTO MELAO
- 2002 -“Adán y Eva, buscando la manzana perdida”. NOVOTEL. Miramar, La Habana. Cuba. Proyecto Melao
- 2004 - Exhibition of the Collection of Cuban Art of Paul Maurer
- 2004 – “Mayo Abstracto” Centro de Arte Contemporáneo Wifredo Lam. Mayo-Junio.
- 2004 – “Cuba en las Artes Plásticas” “El Pabilo” Cafebreria. Cancún, México.
- 2004 – “7e x [23 y 12]” Galeria 23 y 12 Ciudad de la Habana, 16 de Octubre.
- 2004 – “Arte y Moda” Fortaleza de la Cabaña FIART 2004.
- 2005 – “Arte y Moda” Museo del Ron, Ciudad de la Habana.
- 2005 – “Arte y Moda” Hotel Meliá COHIBA, Ciudad de la Habana.
- 2005 – Abstraction from another Dimension at the Tribes Gallery and Gallery One Twenty Eight, by a grant from the Andy Warhol Foundation in New York City, New York.
- 2005 - Espinazo acero “Escultura Transeúnte at the Museo Nacional de Bellas Artes” in Havana.
- 2005 - Escultura Cubana at the Palacio de Convenciones de Cuba in Havana.
- 2005 - ART FROM CUBA at the Chelsea Gallery, in New York City, New York.
- 2005 - The Latin American & Caribbean contemporary Art Today at the Galería PROMOARTE in Tokyo Japan,
- 2006 - VIII Expo de Arte Contemporáneo Cubano en Japón, Galería del Takanawa Kummin Center, Tokyo, Japan.

Some of his public works sculptures are: Larva, 1979, at the Hospital Provincial Gustavo Alderequía in Cienfuegos, Cuba; Los Naranjos, 1981, at the Municipio Caimito, Havana Province, Cuba; Gaviota de Sol, 1983, in Varadero, Matanzas, Cuba; Variaciones del Cubo, 1984, at the Parque René Fraga in Matanzas, Cuba; Descomposición del Cubo, 1985–86, Topes de Collantes, Cuba; Señalización Escultórica, 1990–92, Topes de Collantes, Cuba; Guardián del Cayo, 1999, Cayo Largo; Busto de Julio Antonio Mella, 2003, at the Hospital Clínico Quirúrgico in 10 de Octubre, Havana; Conexión X, 2003, at the Universidad de Ciencias Informáticas in Havana; Paloma, 2005, at the Prefactura de Gunma in Fujioka, Japan; and Árbol de los Vientos, 2007, at the Plaza Antillana, Ciudad de la Vela, Venezuela.
