= Eliseu (given name) =

Eliseu is a masculine given name which may also refer to:

- Eliseu Cassamá (born 1994), Bissau-Guinean football right-back
- Eliseu Ganda (born 1968), Angolan sailor
- Eliseu Antônio Vinagre Ferreira de Godoy, known as Eliseu (footballer, born 1945), Brazilian former footballer
- Eliseu Meifrèn (1857–1940), Spanish impressionist painter
- Eliseu Padilha (1945–2023), Brazilian politician, Minister of the Brazilian Civil Aeronautics Government Department and Minister of Transport and Infrastructure
- Eliseu Maria Coroli (1900–1982), Italo-Brazilian prelate of the Roman Catholic Church
- Eliseu Martins Ramalho, known as Eliseu (footballer, born 1952), Portuguese football midfielder
- Eliseu Pereira dos Santos (born 1983), known as Eliseu, Portuguese football left-back
- Eliseu dos Santos (born 1976), Paralympic boccia player
- Eliseu Visconti (1866–1944), Brazilian painter and cartoonist

== See also ==
- Eliseu Martins, a municipality in Piauí, Brazil
- Elizeu
- Eliseus
