= Elli Leadbeater =

British bee expert

- Education: University of Edinburgh (BSc) Leiden University (MSc) Queen Mary University of London (PhD)
- Scientific career
- Workplaces: Institute of Zoology, Royal Holloway University of London

Ellouise "Elli" Leadbeater is an ecologist and evolutionary biologist in the UK. In 2024 she was appointed Professor of Ecosystems and Biodiversity Research at University College London.

== Education and career ==
Leadbeater was educated at the University of Edinburgh where she was awarded a Bachelor of Science in Biology in 2001 and Leiden University where she did a MSc in Evolutionary and Ecological Science in 2004. She was awarded her PhD in 2008 at Queen Mary University of London having looked at "Social information use in foraging bumblebees". Leadbeater was a research fellow at the Institute of Zoology and then a lecturer at Royal Holloway, University of London where in 2019 she was appointed Professor of Ecology and Evolution. In 2024 she was appointed Professor of Ecosystems and Biodiversity Research at University College London.

== Research ==
Her research looks at insect cognition and how this is affected by the animals' environment.

She has looked at how bumblebees can learn where to find nectar, by watching other bees within an arena choose a particular flower colour that bears nectar, and then choosing the same colour flower when they enter the arena. Leadbeater's team have studied the honey bee waggle dance, looking at the specific genes in the bee brain that are switched on following the dance, to see how changes in the environment affects the bee foraging and communication to others.

Her work has also looked at the effect of insecticide toxicity on bees and she supported the 2013 EU moratorium and later ban on neonicotinoid insecticides. Her work has shown that chemical insecticides can affect bee learning and memory, such as remembering which flowers near a colony have nectar or have been emptied. She has advised caution on new insecticide products such as Sulfoxaflor and her team found that the compound affected bumblebee colony reproduction, with colonies exposed to the compound not producing new queens and subsequent work showed that exposed colonies laid fewer eggs with fewer bumblebee larvae hatching.
