= Elly Mayday =

Canadian model and women's health advocate

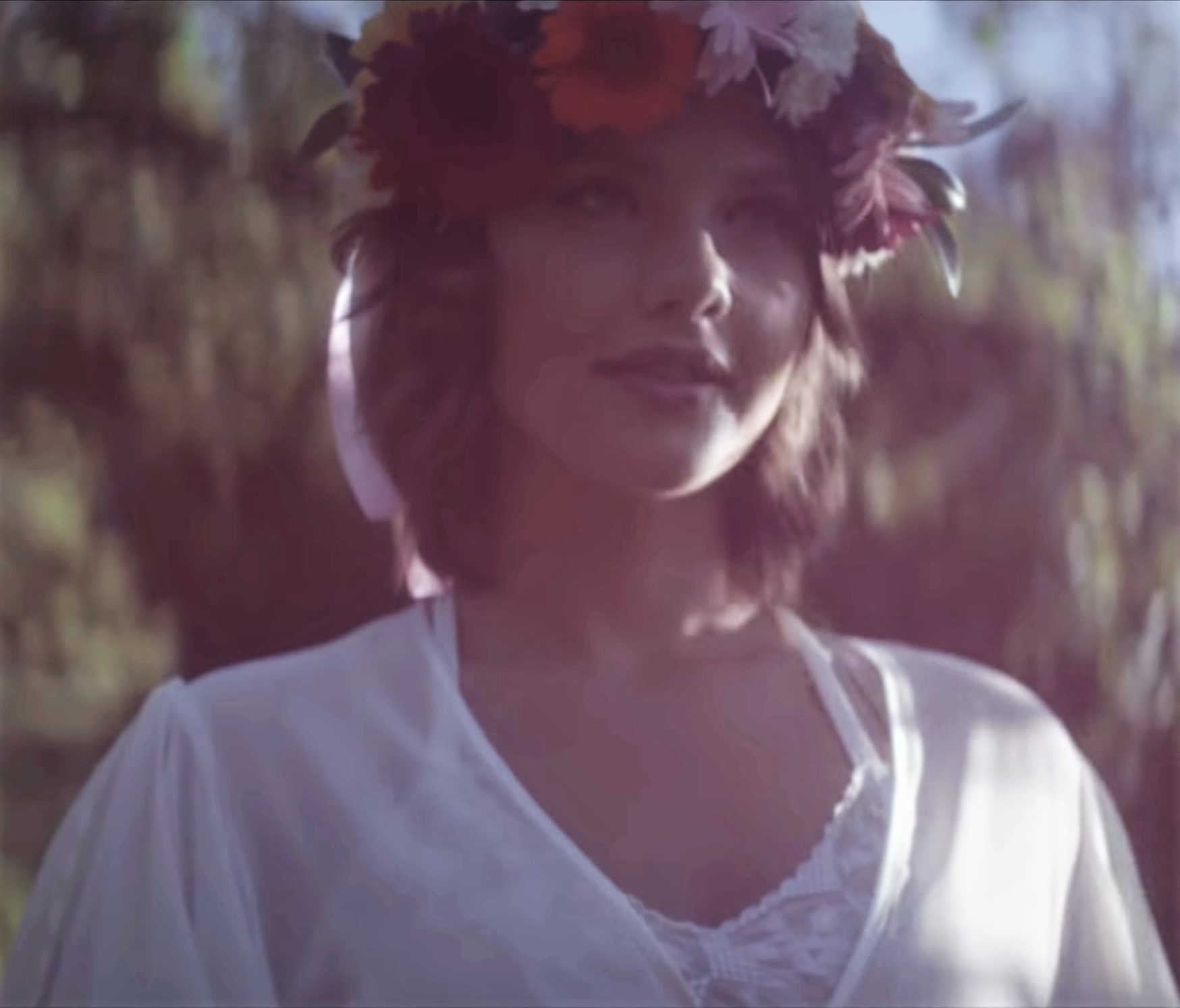
- Mayday in A Perfect 14
- Born: Ashley Shandrel Luther; April 15, 1988; Aylesbury, Saskatchewan, Canada
- Died: March 1, 2019 (aged 30); Vancouver, British Columbia, Canada
- Occupation(s): Model, advocate
- Years active: 2011–2018
- Known for: Plus-size modeling, ovarian cancer advocacy
- Modeling information
- Height: 5 ft 8 in (173 cm)
- Hair color: Blonde
- Eye color: Blue
- Agency: Dorothy Combs Models
- Website: www.facebook.com/EllyMaydayOfficialFanpage/

Ashley Shandrel Luther (April 15, 1988 – March 1, 2019), better known as Elly Mayday, was a Canadian plus-size model and advocate for women's health. She was known for battling ovarian cancer throughout her modeling career, and was often photographed with surgical scars and a bald head from chemotherapy.

== Early life ==
Mayday was born Ashley Shandrel Luther on April 15, 1988, and grew up on a farm near Aylesbury, Saskatchewan (population 50). She grew up with three brothers; her family grew crops, raised cattle, horses, pigs and chickens, and ran a local restaurant. Her mother was an artist. Mayday went to boarding school at age 13, then studied gender studies and psychology at university, and afterwards took a room with her brother in Vancouver.

== Modeling career ==
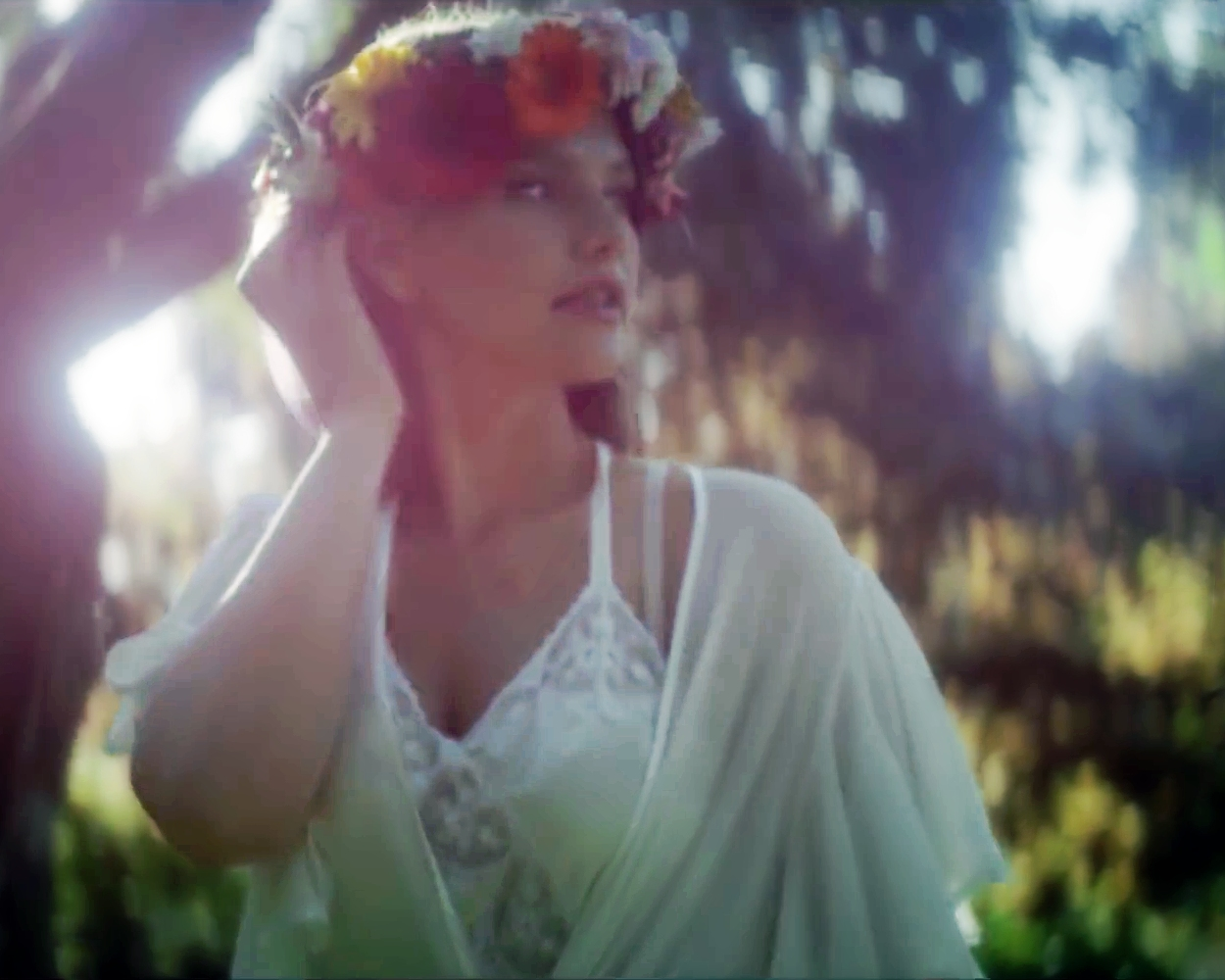
Mayday in A Perfect 14

When she was 23 years old, Mayday was working as a flight attendant for Sunwing Airlines, which took her to routes including Cuba, Mexico, and Jamaica. She was also trying to work as a model. She adopted her stage name, Elly Mayday, as a combination of Elly May Clampett, a character from The Beverly Hillbillies, and Mayday, the emergency procedure word, from her aviation career. She was told she was not tall or thin enough for traditional modeling, but that her 34-29-44 measurements were ideal for pin-up modeling; she won a contest for a local auto show, and was the main subject of an award-winning documentary chronicling her cancer and modeling career called A Perfect 14, referring to her clothing size.

Mayday began feeling symptoms which she would describe as excruciating lower back and abdomen pain, accompanied by pressure in her lower stomach, recurring bladder infections, and a constant feeling of being unwell. She went to the emergency room four times. Doctors did not consider cancer because of her age; instead, she said, they told her that her symptoms were a result of her weight, and advised her to exercise and strengthen her core. She lost 30 pounds (14 kg), but her pain did not go away.

Mayday's continued attempts at modeling succeeded, and by early 2013 she became a model for Forever Yours, a Vancouver all-sizes lingerie company. Her symptoms increased in the summer of 2013, and she returned to her doctors saying that she would refuse to work until she was diagnosed. She was diagnosed with ovarian cancer, specifically stage III low-grade serous carcinoma, a rare form of cancer normally seen in older women. She was 25 years old.

Mayday had four surgeries, including a hysterectomy, which left scars, and three months of chemotherapy which left her bald. She continued to model, and decided to embrace her baldness and scars as an opportunity to talk about her cancer. Sonya Perkins, the owner of Forever Yours, was hesitant at first, but says the campaign was a success. Photos of Mayday with a bald head and surgery scars gained her tens of thousands of followers on Facebook. She also landed an international modeling contract with Jaclyn Sarka, founder of JAG Models in New York City, who had seen her photos on Instagram before hearing about her cancer diagnosis.

She was originally called a plus-size model by industry standards, a label which she rejected, saying that she embraced her size 14 body, and was normal size. Over the year and a half course of her cancer treatment, Mayday lost 60 pounds (27 kg), down to 120 pounds (54 kg) and size 10, which she says caused "skinny shaming" on social media. Some of her former fans or friends accused her of using her cancer to make money and become famous.

In July 2014, Mayday was told she was cancer free. She flew to Australia to front a campaign for the Australian Women's Weekly, and was one of six models featured in plus-size lingerie company Lane Bryant's #ImNoAngel campaign in April 2015, displaying women with model-atypical body types. Her unretouched surgery scars were visible in the photographs. In June 2015, Mayday's cancer returned, and she had a fifth surgery to remove another tumor. She posted pictures from this surgery to Instagram as well, referring to her scars as "beauty marks" but she stopped referring to herself as cancer free.

Mayday kept modeling in New York until 2017, when her disease recurred, and she returned to Canada. In 2017, Mayday was the face of Canadian plus-size clothing store Addition Elle's campaign to raise money for Ovarian Cancer Canada. She posted about the difficult parts of her treatments on Instagram, including pictures of her exhausted, and videos of her talking about vomiting and undergoing chemotherapy.

In 2018, she wrote an article for Flare magazine about her hysterectomy making her unable to have children. It was the first of her major operations. She had planned on eventually having five children, and when she was diagnosed consulted a fertility specialist about collecting her eggs, but was told that the drugs used would increase the progression of her cancer, so she decided against it. "I need to take care of the young girls that need me or need this voice. That's my way of parenting for now," she told the CBC.

== Death ==
Mayday died in Vancouver on March 1, 2019, aged 30. Her disease had progressed, especially during the last months, and the doctors were unable to help any more. A high school friend who flew in to see her said that Mayday had accepted death. At the time of her death, Mayday's Facebook page had 500,000 followers.
