= Elishama =

Elishama (Hebrew: אלישמע My God Heard) may refer to:

- Elishama ben Ammihud, a biblical figure
- Elishama, son of David, born in Jerusalem, mentioned in the second Book of Samuel (2 Samuel 5:16)
- A descendant of Sheshan and son of Jekamiah, mentioned in the first Book of Chronicles (1 Chron 2:34-41)
- Elishama, Israel, a moshav in central Israel
