= Elisei =

Yelisey, Yelisei, Elisey or Elisei (Russian: Елисей) is a Russian masculine given name equivalent to Elisha; it is also an occasional surname. The name may refer to the following notable people:

- Elisey (Ganaba) (born 1962), archbishop of the diocese of The Hague and the Netherlands of the Russian Orthodox Church
- Elisei Morozov (1798–1868), Russian entrepreneur
- Elisey Mysin (born 2010), Russian pianist, composer, child prodigy and actor
- Yelisey Goryachev (1892–1938), Soviet military officer
- Valentina Ardean-Elisei (born 1982), Romanian handballer
