= Bill Elston =

Australian rules footballer

Personal information
- Full name: William Charles Elston
- Born: 4 December 1897; Hamilton, Victoria
- Died: 26 September 1968 (aged 70); Hamilton, Victoria
- Original team: Hamilton
- Height: 170 cm (5 ft 7 in)
- Weight: 62 kg (137 lb)
- Position: Rover/Wing

Playing career^{1}
Years	Club	Games (Goals)
1915	Melbourne	4 (1)
- ^{1} Playing statistics correct to the end of 1915.

William Charles Elston (4 December 1897 – 26 September 1968) was an Australian rules footballer who played with Melbourne in the Victorian Football League (VFL).
