= SKH Bishop Mok Sau Tseng Secondary School =

- Chinese: 聖公會莫壽增會督中學
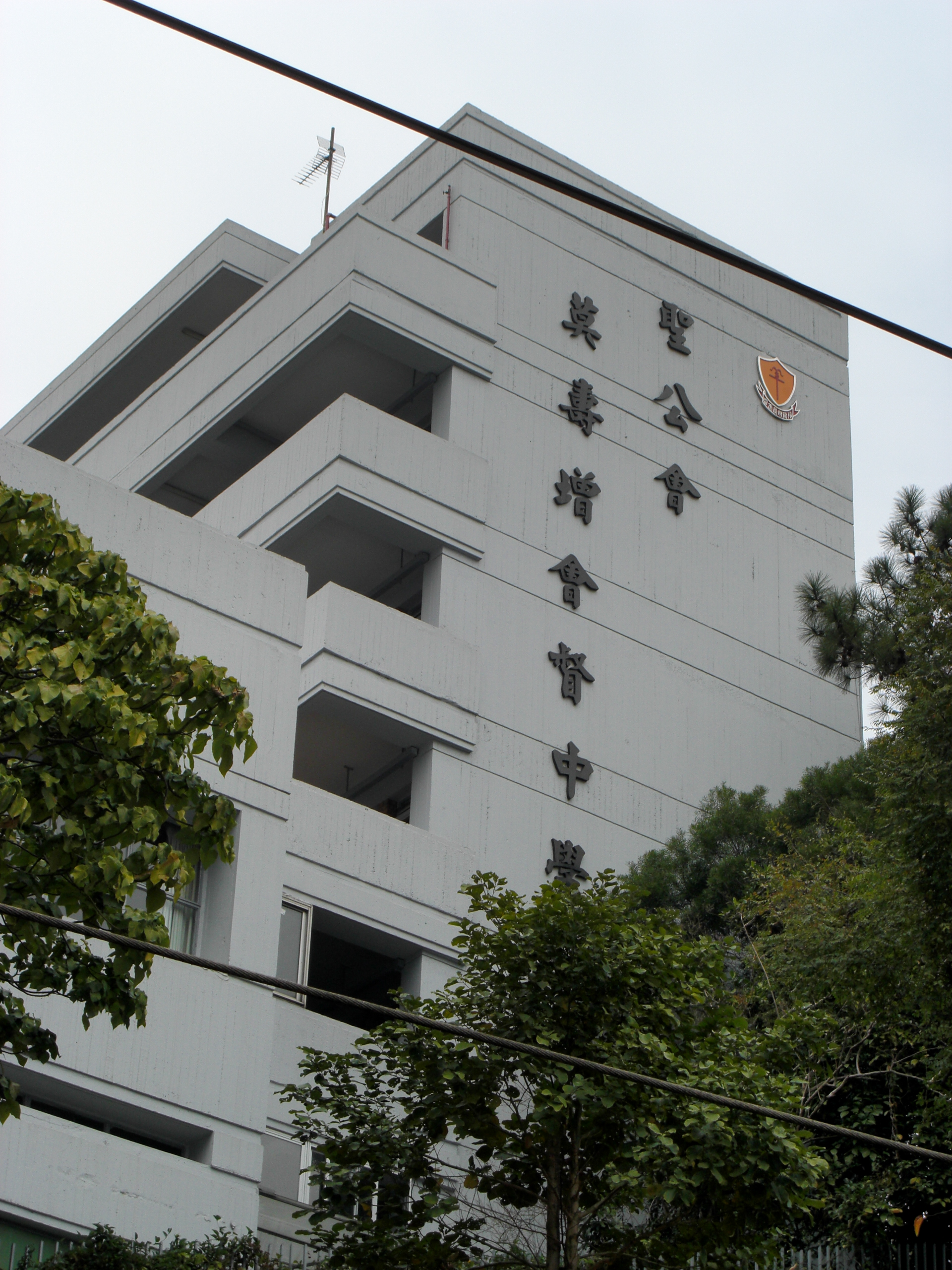

Location
- 26 Wan Tau Kok Lane, Tai Po; 22°26′42.4″N 114°10′11.5″E; Hong Kong

Information
- Type: Aided
- Motto: Moral, Intellectual, Physical, Social, Aesthetics, Spiritual Education (德、智、體、群、美、靈)
- Denomination: Anglican
- Established: 1975; 51 years ago
- School district: Tai Po
- Supervisor: Miss Jennifer Wong Chi Mei
- Principal: Ms Wong Lee Lee
- Staff: 60 (approx.)
- Enrollment: c. 800
- Colours: Maroon and white
- Affiliation: Hong Kong Sheng Kung Hui
- Website: MST Online

SKH Bishop Mok Sau Tseng Secondary School (Traditional Chinese: 聖公會莫壽增會督中學) is a co-educational secondary school in Hong Kong, founded by a group of Christians in 1975, named after the Bishop Mok Sau Tseng of Anglican Church in China (Chung Hua Sheng Kung Hui). The school campus is located on Wan Tau Kok Hill in Tai Po, near Tai Po Market station.

== Class Structure ==
Class	Number of Classes
F.1-F.3	4
F.4-F.6	4

== Houses ==
House
Faith House
Hope House
Love House
Wisdom House

== School Culture ==
The school emphasizes on moral, intellectual, physical, social, aesthetic and spiritual education, nurturing students to deliver positive impact to society.

== Facilities ==
The school campus was awarded the Silver Medal of the Year 1976 from the Hong Kong Institute of Architects.

Completed in 1975, the school campus was situated at the end of Wan Tau Kok Lane in Tai Po, built upon the hillside with reinforced concrete, in Modernist Brutalist style. The two blocks, one high and one low, were arranged at right angles. In the early years the campus was of fair-faced finishes in the colour of natural concrete grey. Maintenance was expensive and the school later on painted the external walls white. The single-loaded corridors were cantilevered, exceptionally wide, decorated with red brick walls, facilitating student interactions and casting neat shadows to the façade. At the southeast corner near the underground tuck shop rises an external bypass staircase that skips the staff room, creating a reachable yet unpassable architectural moment. That became a place of jokes and homework dispatch between teachers and students.

At the north of the campus lies an amphitheatre that connects the school entrance to a rectilinear pond. Before the new extension was added, entering into the school was only possible by crossing the pond via the stepping stones. These stepping stones resemble the entrance design of Tomba Brion by Carlo Scarpa; but whether the architect of the school was aware of the works of Scarpa remains unknown. Floating on the pond are water lilies (Nymphaea tetragona) where koi (Cyprinus rubrofuscus var. "koi") swim underneath; next to the pond was a cypress (Araucaria cunninghamii) once stood on the steep narrow soil for more than thirty years. At the end of the underground playground is an organic farm next to a slope, where squirrels occasionally pass by.

In the late 1990s student number surged. Classroom shortage made the school to extend the building. Fund was sought from the government, the teachers, students, parents and the general public. Today, the school houses multimedia learning center, a student activity Centre, a technology learning centre, a multi-function centre, a library, a computer room, a student union room, a discipline room, a counseling room, a prefects' room, a pastoral room and a school history gallery. All classrooms are equipped with computers, multimedia projectors, hi-fi equipment and speaker systems.
