= Elizeu =

Elizeu is a given name. Notable people with the name include:

- Elizeu (footballer, born 1945), Brazilian football midfielder Elizeu Antônio Ferreira Vinagre Godoy
- Elizeu (footballer, born 1979), Brazilian football defender Elizeu Ferreira Marciano
- Elizeu Zaleski dos Santos (born 1986), Brazilian mixed martial artists
- Elizeu (footballer, born 1989), Brazilian football centre-back Elizeu Araújo de Melo Batista

== See also ==
- Eliseu (given name)
