= Ellie White (musician) =

Romanian singer

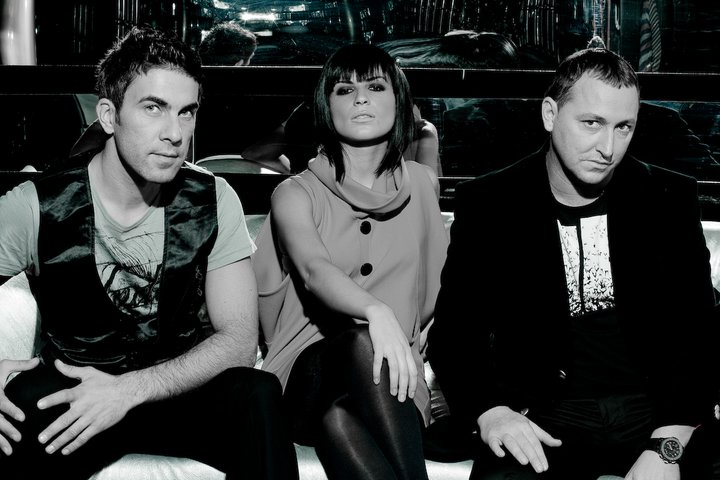
- White with DJ Project

Background information
- Born: Elena Baltagan
- Genres: Pop; dance
- Occupation: Singer
- Website: elliewhite.ro

Elena Baltagan, known as Ellie White, is a Romanian dance music and trance singer-songwriter.

Ellie's ambition to become a solo artist turned out to be a good move: the following year, Elena released her first solo single under her stage name Ellie White. The song (Nu te mai caut) went on straight to the top songs of the Romanian Airplay Chart. In the years that followed, Ellie released HIT singles such as "Sete de noi" and "Power of Love" and won several awards: "Best New Act" at Romanian Music Awards, "Best Romanian Song" at the Callatis Awards, and "Best Star" at Romanian Top Hits, and many more.

During economical interruptions caused by the COVID-19 pandemic, Ellie White released the first of her entirely self-written singles, and established an international career through collaborations with foreign DJs outside of Romania, receiving praise from musicians such as Dutch DJ Armin van Buuren, who played Ellie's single in A State of Trance

== Musical career ==
=== 2003 – 2009: DJ Project ===
In 2003, Ellie became the vocalist of DJ Project and together they released the album "Lumea ta" (EN: Your World).

In 2005, Ellie released her second studio-album together with DJ Project, "Soapte" (EN: Whispers). The first two singles from the album, "Privirea ta" (EN: Your look) and "Soapte" dominated the Romanian charts, were recognized as some of the hits of the year and "Privirea ta" was named the hit of the summer.

2006 started well for the band: DJ Project won the "Best Romanian Act" at the MTV Europe Music Awards. In July, the band released a brand new album, "Povestea mea" (EN: My Story) and one month later, DJ Project receives the "Best Dance Group" award at Romanian Top 100.

In 2007, Ellie and the other members of DJ Projects receive for the second year in a row the award for "Best Dance Group" at Romanian Music Awards. The following year, DJ Project wins with their single "Lacrimi de inger" (EN: Angel's tears) the awards for the "Best Group" at Romanian Music Awards.

At the end of 2009, Elena decides to leave DJ Project and pursue a solo career.

=== 2010 – 2012: The beginning of Ellie's solo career ===
Elena's decision to leave DJ Project was a very discussed topic in the music press. This made her feel a lot of pressure when releasing her first songs. Despite this, though, in October 2010, the singer released her first solo single called "Nu te mai caut" (EN: I'm not searching for you anymore) under the name of Ellie White. The song was well received not only by Ellie's fans, but also by the Romanian radio stations, charting as the 7th Romanian Song in the Romanian Airplay Chart.

In May 2011, Ellie White releases "Power of Love" with a music video that was filmed in various locations from Sicily: the town of Taormina, Etna Volcano, and the Argila beach from Agrigento. The song, as expected, entered the playlists of the Romanian mainstream radios and Ellie White went on to have two songs in the Top 100: Power of Love and Nu te mai caut.

At the end of 2011, the artist releases "Sete de noi", which charted in its first week on the 8th position and soon after became a number 1 hit. The song was heavily played in 2012 and was still charting in the airplay chart in 2013.

In September 2012, Ellie releases "Ziua Mea" with a music video shot in Malta. The song also has an English version, called "Temple of Love".

=== 2013 – 2015: The first international collaborations ===
In the fall of 2013, Ellie White releases her first single in collaboration with an international DJ. Together with the Portuguese artist Kourosh Tazmini, she released "Feel", which was licensed in the United States of America and in some of Europe's most important music markets (such as Germany and Italy).

Only one month after Elena's collaboration with Kourosh Tazmini, Ellie collaborates with Vicky Red for a Romanian-language single. "Vanzator de lumina" (EN: Seller of lights) was composed by Vicky Red and Calin Goia (the lead singer of one of Romania's most important pop-rock bands, Voltaj). The song was produced by one of the few Romanian Grammy Award winners, Alex Cotoi.

In 2013, Ellie also performed at the most important house music event in Romania, Liberty Parade, in front of over 50.000 people.

In the same year, Ellie also participated in one of Romania's most watched TV Shows, "Te cunosc de undeva" (Your Face Sounds Familiar). There, Ellie showed her versatility as an artist, impersonating artists from all genres and impressing the juries and the public.

=== 2016 – present ===
In 2016, Ellie released one of her most successful singles to date, "Mintea mea" (EN: My Mind). The music video of the song was shot in an old Romanian mansion, Conacul Manasia. In the first days of the release, the song managed to be viewed by hundreds of thousands of people.

In parallel, Ellie also started collaborating with more international DJs, establishing herself as one of the main Romanian female voices in the Trance Music world.

In 2018, she releases together with Dave Naven the single "Try for me" and the song is promoted by the Miami-based record label Coldharbour Recordings. A year later, Ellie White releases together with the Lithuanian DJ Anske the song "Bring My Spirit".

Although 2020 was a tough year for Elena because of the COVID-19 pandemic (she was even infected with Coronavirus), she managed to make it a year of success: she released her first self-written singles, she consolidated her career as an international artist (she was even appreciated by Armin van Buuren, which played her music at A State of Trance).

== Personal life ==
Ellie White has been in a relationship with her manager, Doru Tinca, since 2007. The couple has two children, a boy and a girl.

Ellie White is one of the few Romanian artists who shares her life experience as a mother and an artist on her personal blog, frequently writing articles that reflect her lifestyle that is focused on a healthy body and mind, but also includes Ellie's personal views on topics that impact her life. Ellie is straightforward, writing what she feels and thinks. She is also very active sharing insights from her lifestyle as an artist on her social media accounts, Facebook and Instagram (@elliewhitemusic).
