= Ellie G. Shuler Jr. =

United States Air Force general (1936–2024)

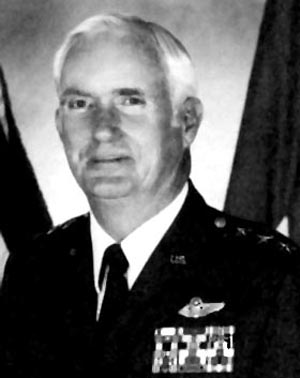
- Lt.Gen. "Buck" Shuler
- Born: December 6, 1936; Raleigh, North Carolina, U.S.
- Died: October 18, 2024 (aged 87); Sumter, South Carolina, U.S.
- Burial place: Ft. Jackson National Cemetery
- Education: The Citadel
- Spouse: Annette Maury Shuler
- Military career
- Allegiance: United States of America
- Branch: United States Air Force
- Service years: 1959–1991
- Rank: Lieutenant General
- Commands: Eighth Air Force; 3rd Air Division; 19th Bombardment Wing; 3902nd Operations Squadron; 86th Civil Engineering Squadron
- Conflicts: Vietnam War

Lieutenant General E.G. "Buck" Shuler Jr. (December 6, 1936 – October 18, 2024) was an American commander of Strategic Air Command's Eighth Air Force in Barksdale Air Force Base, Louisiana. Eighth Air Force is responsible for Strategic Air Command operations in the eastern half of the United States, Europe and the Middle East. It comprises about half of SAC's long-range force of manned bombers, tankers and intercontinental ballistic missiles.

== Biography ==
General Shuler was born in 1936, in Raleigh, North Carolina. He was educated in the city schools of Caracas, Venezuela, and Orangeburg, S.C., graduating from Orangeburg High School in 1955. The general earned a Bachelor of Science degree in civil engineering from The Citadel in 1959 and a Master of Science degree in management from Rensselaer Polytechnic Institute in 1967. He completed Squadron Officer School in 1964, Command and Staff Course of the Naval War College in 1972, and the National War College in 1976.

Shuler, a distinguished graduate of the Reserve Officer Training Corps program, was commissioned as a Second Lieutenant in June 1959 and entered active duty in July. He completed preflight training at Lackland Air Force Base, Texas, and primary flight training at Moore Air Base, Texas. After graduating from T-33 basic jet training at Laredo Air Force Base, Texas, he received his pilot wings in September 1960. General Shuler then was assigned to the 9th Bombardment Squadron, Carswell Air Force Base, Texas, as a B-52F pilot. From September 1963 until June 1966 he served with the 337th Bombardment Squadron, Dyess Air Force Base, Texas, as a B-52E pilot and aircraft commander of a lead crew.

After completing his master's degree in June 1967 General Shuler was assigned to the 68th Tactical Fighter Squadron, George Air Force Base, California, as a replacement training unit fighter pilot. In March 1968 he transferred to the 558th Tactical Fighter Squadron, Cam Ranh Bay Air Base, South Vietnam, as an F-4C aircraft commander. He served as an assistant flight commander and flew 107 combat missions over North Vietnam, the Republic of Vietnam and Laos. He also participated in the 558th Tactical Fighter Squadron's operational deployment to South Korea following the USS Pueblo crisis, flying 15 combat support missions along the Korean demilitarized zone.

Upon returning to the United States in March 1969, General Shuler was assigned to Headquarters 2nd Air Force, Barksdale Air Force Base, as an industrial engineer and subsequently served as deputy chief of the Engineering Management Division. The general completed the Base Civil Engineer Course at Wright-Patterson Air Force Base, Ohio, as a distinguished graduate in November 1969. He completed the Central Flight Instructor Course at Castle Air Force Base, Calif., in April 1970, and assumed additional duties as a T-39 instructor pilot with the 2nd Bombardment Wing standardization board. He ended his tour of duty at Barksdale in July 1971 as the assistant deputy chief of staff for civil engineering.

General Shuler graduated from the Command and Staff Course of the Naval War College in June 1972 and was assigned as assistant executive officer to the commander in chief, U.S. Air Forces in Europe, Linsey Air Station, West Germany. He moved with the headquarters to Ramstein Air Base, West Germany, in 1973.

From July 1973 to July 1975 he served as base civil engineer and commander with the 86th Civil Engineering Squadron at Ramstein. The general completed the National War College in June 1976 and then was assigned to Offutt Air Force Base, Neb., where he served as director of operations, 3902nd Air Base Wing, and as commander of the 3902nd Operations Squadron.

In November 1976 General Shuler transferred to Headquarters Strategic Air Command at Offutt and served as director of programs, Office of the Deputy Chief of Staff for Engineering and Services. He was selected to be the executive to the SAC commander in chief in July 1977. In April 1979 he transferred to the 19th Bombardment Wing, Robins Air Force Base, Ga., as vice commander and in January 1980 assumed command of the wing. In July 1980 he was assigned as commander, 42nd Bombardment Wing, Loring Air Force Base, Maine. General Shuler served as commander of 4th Air Division, F.E. Warren Air Force Base, Wyo., from September 1981 until July 1984, when he became commander of 3rd Air Division, Andersen Air Force Base, Guam. In July 1986 he returned to Headquarters Strategic Air Command as assistant deputy chief of staff for operations and in December 1986 became deputy chief of staff for operations. He assumed his last command in March 1988. Shuler retired on 1 June 1991.

Shuler died in Sumter, South Carolina, on October 18, 2024, at the age of 87.

== Awards and honors ==
The general is a command pilot with more than 7,500 flying hours, including 209 combat hours accrued during the Vietnam War. General Shuler was a member of Tau Beta Pi, a national engineering honor society. He was promoted to lieutenant general March 23, 1988, with same date of rank.

On October 10, 2014, at the 8th Air Force Historical Society Annual Reunion in Nashville, Tennessee, the "Southern Ontario Wing" was renamed "Lt. Gen. "Buck" Shuler Jr. Chapter".

Command Pilot Wings
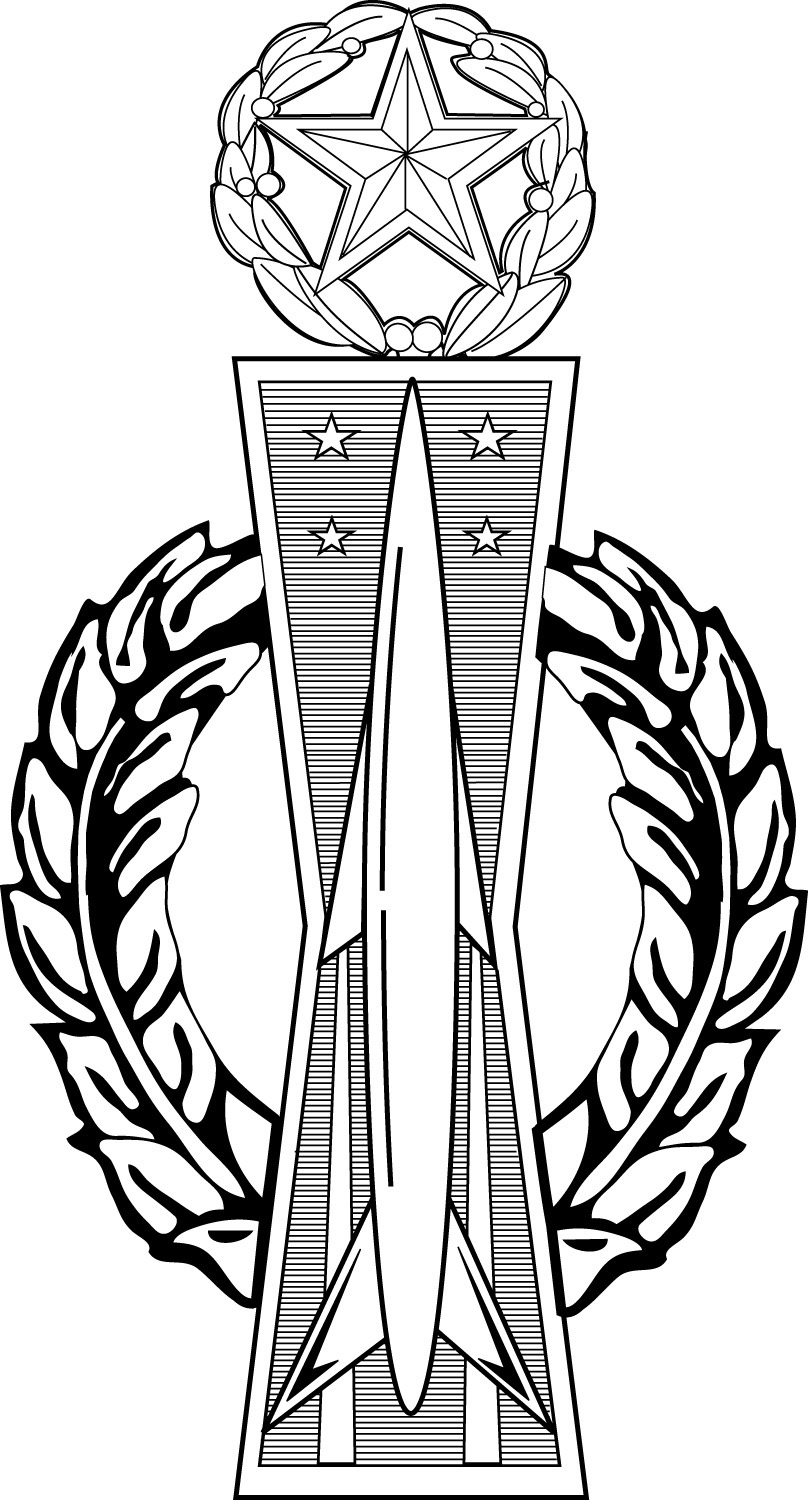
Master Missile Badge

Air Force Distinguished Service Medal
Legion of Merit with oak leaf cluster
Distinguished Flying Cross
Air Medal with five oak leaf clusters
Air Force Commendation Medal with oak leaf cluster
Order of National Security Merit (Korea), Cheonsu Medal
