= Ellie Junod =

Australian basketball player

Personal information
- Born: 15 February 1993 (age 33) Penrith, New South Wales
- Listed height: 6 ft 0 in (1.83 m)

Career information
- Playing career: 2013–present
- Position: Forward

Career history
- 2013–2016: Canberra Capitals

Ellie Junod (born 15 February 1993) is an Australian professional basketball player who played for the Canberra Capitals in the Women's National Basketball League.

== Professional career ==
=== WNBL ===
Junod began her professional career in 2013, with the Canberra Capitals under the leadership of Carrie Graf. She was re-signed twice for the following two seasons. She has yet to be re-signed for 2016–17.
