= Elli Rose =

Japanese fashion model

- エリーローズ
- Born: Eri Arakawa (荒川エリ); 25 September 1986 (age 39); Tokyo, Japan
- Other name: Elli Rose
- Years active: 1998–present
- Known for: fashion model, DJ, talent, actor
- Parent(s): Maxine Van-Cliffe Arakawa (mother), Hiroyuki Arakawa (father)
- Modeling information
- Height: 167 cm (5 ft 6 in)
- Hair color: Dark brown
- Eye color: Hazel
- Agency: LesPros Entertainment

Elli Rose (エリーローズ, Erī Rōzu) (born Eri Arakawa; 25 September 1986), is a Japanese fashion model, DJ, talent and actor.

She belongs to LesPros Entertainment. Her old stage name was her real name Eri Arakawa (荒川エリ, Arakawa Eri). She is particularly famous for her appearance in the women's fashion magazine ViVi.

== Early life ==
Eri Arakawa was born in Tokyo, Japan, on 25 September 1986. Her father is Japanese professional photographer Hiroyuki Arakawa (荒川弘之, Arakawa Hiroyuki), and her mother is British creative director Maxine Van-Cliffe Arakawa (マキシーン・ヴァンクリフ・荒川). At 12 years old, photographer Kishin Shinoyama spotted her and collaborated with her mother to release the photobook "ELLI-ROSE". Shinoyama recommended her to join a modeling agency.

== Career ==
When she was 12, she made her debut as a model (Nicomo) for the teen fashion magazine Nicola. Since then, she has been active as a model for women's fashion magazine ViVi and lingerie brand Ravijour and she appeared on ViVi for 10 years from 2005 to 2015.

When Gina, a sister magazine of JELLY, was first published in 2011, she appeared in the first issue with Kana Oya, Shaula Vogue, Kozue Akimoto, Maiko Takahashi, Aya Hoshi and four other models.

In 2007, she started working as a club DJ with fashion model Diego Limma and the DJ unit Van Cliffe.D. The unit name comes from the combination of her companion's name Diego ("D") and her British surname Van Cliffe. Thereafter, she worked alone as Van Cliffe from high-brand parties to local festivals such as Trussardi, Shu Uemura and Yves Saint Laurent Beauté. In March 2014, she was a DJ at an event of Veuve Clicquot at Isetan in Shinjuku. She changed her DJ name to "Elli Arakawa" in the spring of 2015.

== Personal life ==
She has good relations with fashion model Marie, who was with ViVi, since junior high school. She also has a good relationship with fashion model Koko Kinoshita. Elli Rose was a DJ at an event in which Kinoshita appeared. She's a close friend of Japanese model and singer Mary Sara since the beginning of her entertainment activities, and they often appear in magazines in the "Erisara" combination.

== Appearance ==
=== Magazines ===
- Nicola (Shinchosha)
- CUTiE (Takarajimasha)
- Non-no (Shueisha)
- Spa! (Fusosha Publishing)
- Seda (Hinode Publishing)
- Sabra (Shogakukan)
- Vita (KK Bestsellers)
- soup (Index Magazines)
- ollie Girls (Magazine House)
- More (Shueisha)
- Junie (Fusosha Publishing Co., Ltd.)
- S Cawaii! (Shufunotomo)
- Blenda (Kadokawa Haruki Office)
- Glamorous (Kodansha)
- Shel'tter
- ViVi (Kodansha)
- Olive (Magazine House)
- PS (Round House)
- An An (Magazine House)
- Music and people (Shinko Music)
- vikka (Sanei Shobo)
- Nylon Japan (Transmedia)
- Vogue Nippon (Condé Nast Publications)
- Gina (Bunkasha)
- Tokyo ViVi (Kodansha)
- it ♥ magazine (Kodansha)

=== TV shows ===
- Tokyo Girls Collection
- Kobe Collection
- Tokyo Runway
- GirlsAward
- Taiwan Super Girls Collection
- Show Room Under (Tokyo Fashion Week)
- f*mode
- Glamorous
- Niigata Fashion Business College
- Roxy
- Campus Queen Collection 2009 in Fukuoka

=== Photo albums ===
- "Elli-Rose" (Shinchosha, 1998) Photographer: Kishin Shinoyama Commentary: Miri Yu
- "MEDIA GIRLS Volume04 21st Century Beautiful Girls" (Clubhouse, 1999)
- "Mika Ninagawa Photobook like a peach" (Kodansha, 2002) Photo: Mika Ninagawa
- "Evergreen" (Shufu to Seikatsusha, 2005) Photo: Motoyuki Kobayashi

=== Advertising ===
- Yomiuri Land Pool WAI (2007, 2008)
- Glassow Vitamin Water (Coca-Cola Japan, Summer 2011, Photo: Mika Ninagawa) Nobuaki Kaneko, Ena Matsumoto, Rina Ota, Yosuke Kubozuka.

=== CM ===
- Unilever Japan "mod's hair" (2011)
- GU "Knit Wear Freedom." (2013)

=== Television ===
- Play Room Ver.2.0 (BS Fuji, 2001) Moderator on Monday
- Summer Sonic 05 (TV Asahi, 2005)
- Music Headline (Space Shower TV, April 2006 – December 2006)
- Mezamashi TV (Fuji TV, October 2006 – March 2007) --Hayami Musume (No. 1 reporter in the early ear trend)
- Good TV ~ HAO TV ~ (Fuji TV, 2006)
- Summer Sonic 06 (TV Asahi, 2006)
- studio XL (Space Shower TV, April 2008–)
- Football CX - Football DX - UEFA Champions League Digest (Fuji TV, September 2008–)
- Raji Karu (NTV, 17 June 2008, broadcast on 6 January 2009) Appeared in the "Daisuke Shima's Ore-sama's Branch" section
- Happy Bean (RKB Mainichi Broadcasting, 24 December 2008–)
- Goddess Search (TBS, April 2009 – March 2010)
- Discovery of the World's Wonders! (TBS, 25 July 2015) Guest appearance

=== DJ ===
- 2015, Dommune
- 2016, Dommune
- 2017, Dommune
- 2016, Dax Space Shower
- 2020, Boiler Room Tokyo
- 2020, Contact Tokyo
- 2021, collaboration with Frankie $

=== Radio ===
- Junko Koshino Masaca (7 November 2021, TBS Radio)

=== Other ===
- TV drama: Bishoujo H2 (Fuji TV, 1999) Episode 14 "Twilight Paradise" (Eri and Eri no Ishi), Eri
- Record sleeve: Futari One Man II (RYO the SKYWALKER, 2001)
- Film: Koala Kacho (produced in 2005, screened in 2006) on DVD (2006, avex trax, AVBC-22752)
- Radio program: Radicanthropus 2.0 (Radio Nippon, 23 May 2008) 29th Personality
- Catalog: Ravijour Style Book (Mook book, released on 23 April 2010) Co / Seri Iwahori, Mary Sara, Akane Satomi, etc.

=== Works ===
==== Books ====
- Photobook: ELLIROSE (Shinchosha, May 1998, ISBN 4103262109) Photo: Kishin Shinoyama.
- Photo art style book ELLI-ROSE (Takarajimasha, 24 February 2016).
- A Room with Good Sound (Magazine House, 5 December 2017).

==== CD ====
- Album VAN CLIFFE.D - ELLI-ROSE (UNIVERSAL J, July 2007, UPCH-1727 / 8) * 2 disc specifications
