= Elrod (surname) =

Elrod is a surname. Notable people with the name may refer to:

- Arthur Elrod, American interior designer
- David Elrod, musician in The Union Trade
- Henry Talmage Elrod, American recipient of Medal of Honor
- Jack Elrod, American cartoonist
- Jennifer Walker Elrod, Jurist, Chief Judge of the United States Court of Appeals for the Fifth Circuit
- Jon Elrod, American politician from Indiana
- Morton John Elrod, American ecologist from Montana
- P. N. Elrod, writer
- Richard Elrod, American politician from Illinois
- Samuel H. Elrod, American politician from South Dakota

== Fictional ==
- David Elrod, character in Altars of Desire
- Elrod of Melvinbone, a character from Cerebus comics
