= Elesha Gayman =

American politician

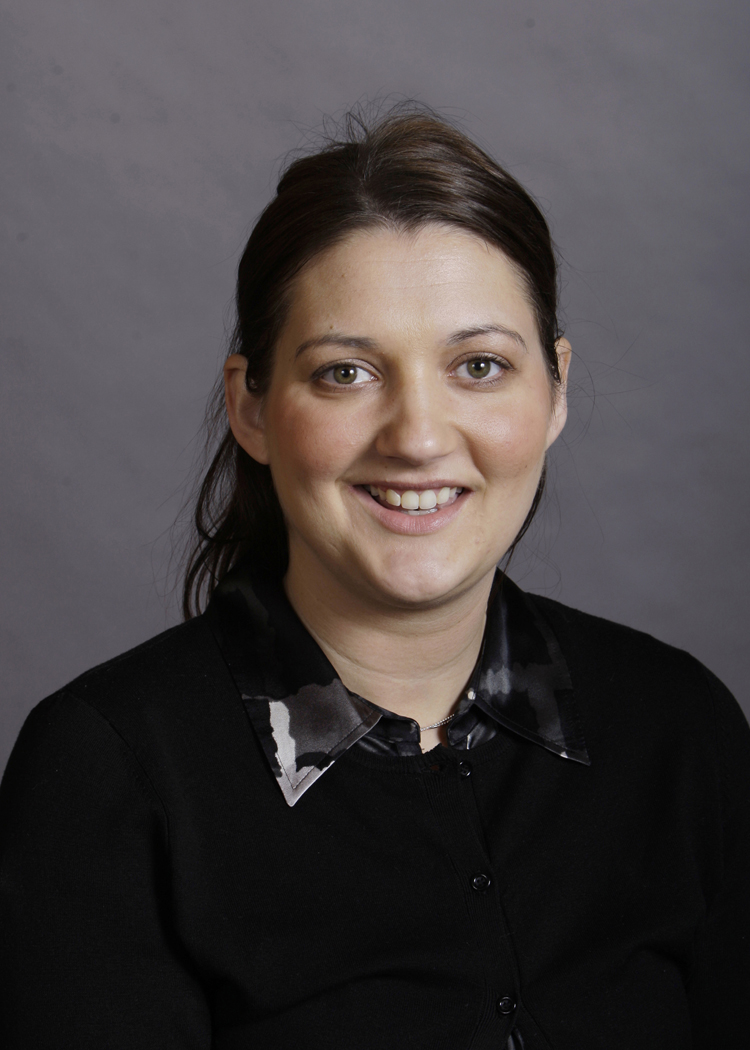

Member of the Iowa House of Representatives from the 84th district
- In office January 8, 2007 – January 9, 2011
- Preceded by: Jim Van Fossen
- Succeeded by: Ross Paustian

Personal details
- Born: Davenport, Iowa
- Party: Democratic
- Education: University of Iowa
- Occupation: SAFER Foundation Youth Empowerment Program
- Website: Gayman's official website Gayman campaign website

Elesha L. Gayman is a former Iowa State Representative from the 84th District. She served in the Iowa House of Representatives from 2007 to 2011. Gayman served on several committees in the Iowa House - the Agriculture committee; the Appropriations committee; the Education committee; and the Public Safety committee. She was vice-chair of the Health and Human Services Appropriations Subcommittee.

Gayman is a 1997 graduate of Davenport West High School, attended St. Ambrose University, spent a semester of her sophomore year at Loyola University’s Rome Center in Italy, earned a BA (political science) from the University of Iowa in 2001, and an MPA from Drake University through the Quad Cities Graduate Center in 2007.

She was a delegate to the 2004 Democratic National Convention and campaign manager (for four northeast Iowa counties) in John Kerry's President Campaign in 2004. She was a staffer for State Sen. Brian Schoenjahn, and an intern for State Sen. Pat Deluhery. When she was 13 she went to Davenport's city hall and argued against the youth curfew. In the 2008 United States presidential election, she was Eastern Iowa Political Director for Barack Obama’s Presidential Caucus Campaign.

Gayman was elected in 2006 with 5,429 votes (50%), defeating Republican incumbent Jim Van Fossen. She was re-elected in 2008.

Iowa House of Representatives
Preceded by Jim Van Fossen	84th District; 2007 – present	Succeeded by Incumbent
