= Elli Björkstén =

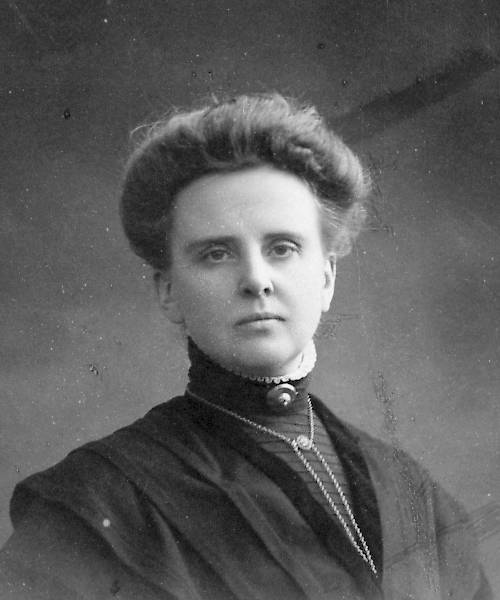
- Born: 16 October 1870; Lappeenranta, Grand Duchy of Finland
- Died: 6 March 1947 (aged 76); Helsinki, Finland
- Education: Gymnastik- och idrottshögskolan
- Occupation: Coach

Kristina Elisabeth (Elli) Björkstén (16 October 1870 – 6 March 1947) was a Finnish gymnastics coach and theorist. Björkstén was the first coach in the Nordic countries to separate from the usual military gymnastics. She also served as the inaugural president of the Scandinavian Association for Women Gymnastics, however disliked competitive sports.

== Early life ==
Björkstén was born in 1870 in Lappeenranta into a Swedish-speaking family as the only girl to parents Johan Isak Björkstén and Elise Ollongrén. The Ollongrén family was a Swedish military family. As a child, her family moved to Forssa when the father got a provincial medical service in Tammela, and she grew up alongside Christian Sibelius. Björkstén trained as a gymnastics coach in Elin Asp's Institute in Helsinki and took a sabbatical to learn German gymnastics.

== Coaching career ==
While working as the head teacher for women's gymnastics at the University of Helsinki, Björkstén began to question the legitimacy of the Pehr Henrik Ling method of gymnastics. She found the traditional, military-style gymnastics too stiff and formal when it should be, in her opinion, stimulating experience in everyday life. As a result, Björkstén developed a newer form of gymnastics which focused on freedom, energy, liveliness, and rhythm in movements. She was appointed the head coach of the Finnish gymnastics team at the 1912 Summer Olympics and her method became widespread across Europe. Prior to her influence, there had been no distinction between male and female gymnasts. Although she coached the Olympic team, Björkstén disliked competitive sports and medal for she questioned the health benefits of hard training.

Following the Olympic Games, Björkstén became the first chair of the Swedish Federation of Physical Education for Women in Finland and the first lecturer in educational gymnastics at the Institute of Physical Education. She also served as the inaugural president of the Scandinavian Association for Women Gymnastics and held courses in Scandinavian countries every year. As a result of her gymnastics theory, she was invited to become Honorary member of The Ling Association and received official recognition in Scandinavia, Denmark, Sweden, and Finland.

Björkstén died in 1947 in Helsinki, at the age of 76.

== Selected publications ==
- Principles of gymnastics for women and girls
