= Elli Stamatiadou =

Greek botanist (1933–2015)

- Born: 1 April 1933; Andros, Greece
- Died: 1 May 2015 (aged 82); Athens, Greece
- Occupation: botanist
- Employer: Goulandris Natural History Museum

Elli Stamatiadou (born 1 April 1933 in Andros, Greece - died 1 May 2015, Athens, Greece) was a successful amateur Greek botanist.

== Biography ==
She was the chief curatorial assistant at the herbarium of Goulandris Natural History Museum (ATH), from 1965 to 2009 and the greatest contributor to the Museum’s botanical collections (23,705 specimens from all over Greece including over 20 type specimens). She retired in 2003 but continued working voluntarily until 2009.

== Family ==
She was married to Yiannis Stamatiadis, together they had 2 children. Their son Stamatis Stamatiadis is a soil microbiologist and he has developed the Soil Ecology and Biotechnology Laboratory at the Goulandris Natural History Museum.

== Species ==
The plant species Dianthus stamatiadae Rech. f. (a Greek endemic plant species from the region of Kozani), Veronica stamatiadae M.A. Fischer & Greuter (a Veronica species, first collected by Stamatiadou from the island of Ro in the Kastellorizo island group) and Allium stamatiadae are named after her.

== Publications ==
- Zahariadi, C., Stamatiadou, E. & Dima, A. 1982. Geographical distribution of species of Ornithogalum (Liliaceae) in Greece, including two new taxa. – Ann. Mus. Goulandris, 5: 131-162.
- Snogerup, S., Snogerup, B., Stamatiadou, E., von Bothmer, R. & Gustafsson, M. 2006. Flora and vegetation of Andros, Kiklades, Greece. – Ann. Mus. Goulandris, 11: 85-270.
