= Elli Stai =

Greek journalist and talk show presenter

Elli Stai (Greek: Έλλη Στάη; born 21 March 1954, Athens) is a Greek journalist and talk show presenter on Greek TV.

== Education ==
She graduated from School of Law, Economics and Political Sciences of the University of Athens. She also studied Political Sciences in France. For a small period of time she worked as a lawyer.

== Career ==
She started her career as a journalist at the Greek newspapers [Mesimvrini] and [Acropolis], where she had her first front page with the interview of Gianni Agnelli. Her television career started from ERT (Greek Public Television), in the early 1980s. In 1989 she worked for Flash 96 radiostation, as a reporter of European matters in Brussels.

In 1993 she returned to Greece as an anchorwoman at the News Bulletin for SKAI television. In 1996 she presented the talk show Ellispontos at MEGA CHANNEL.

From 1997 until 2006 she worked for STAR TV, where she presented the News Bulletin. From 1999 until 2006 she presented the talk show Me ta matia tis Ellis, and later she was the anchorwoman of the news bulletin of ANT1 TV.

In 2007, she returned to Mega Channel TV, as the anchorwoman of the talk show Elli, as well as a commentator for the news Bulletin. In January 2008, Elli Stai became the anchorwoman of ALPHA TV, for the News Bulletin. In 2009 she returned to Flash 96 radiostation with the radio show Ellispoint at Flash96.

In February 2011 she returned to Public TV [ERT] as an anchorwoman for the News Bulletin, as well as presenting the weekly talk show NETWEEK. ERT1.

== Filmography ==
=== Television ===
| Year | Title | Role(s) | Notes | Ref. |
|---|---|---|---|---|
| 1983-1989 | ERT Central News | Herself (anchor) | National television evening news | |
| 1993-1995 | Skai Central News | Herself (anchor) | Monday to Friday evening news on Skai TV | |
| 1995-1997 | Ellispondos with Elli Stai | Herself (host) | Late night talk show on MEGA | |
| 1997-1999 | Star Central News | Herself (anchor) | Monday to Friday evening news on STAR | |
| 1999-2006 | ANT1 Central News | Herself (anchor) | Monday to Friday evening news on ANT1 | |
| 1999-2006 | With the eyes of Elli | Herself (host) | Late night talk show on ANT1 | |
| 2007 | Mega Central News | Herself (opinionist) | Monday to Friday evening news on MEGA | |
| 2007 | Elli with Elli Stai | Herself (host) | Late night talk show on MEGA | |
| 2007 | Persona Grata with Elli Stai | Herself (host) | Late night talk show on Alpha TV | |
| 2007-2008 | Alpha Central News | Herself (anchor) | Monday to Friday evening news on Alpha TV | |
| 2011-2013 | NET Central News | Herself (anchor) | Monday to Friday evening news on NET | |
| 2011-2013 | NET Week with Elli Stai | Herself (host) | Late night talk show on NET | |
| 2015 | Intrigue with Elli Stai | Herself (host) | Late night talk show on Alpha TV | |
| 2018-2019 | OPEN Central News | Herself (anchor) | Monday to Friday evening news on OPEN | |
| 2019 | Open Mind with Elli Stai | Herself (host) | Late night talk show on OPEN | |
| 2023-present | OPEN Central News | Herself (opinionist) | Monday to Friday evening news on OPEN | |
