= Elli Papakonstantinou =

Greek stage director and activist (born 1973)

- Έλλη Παπακωνσταντίνου
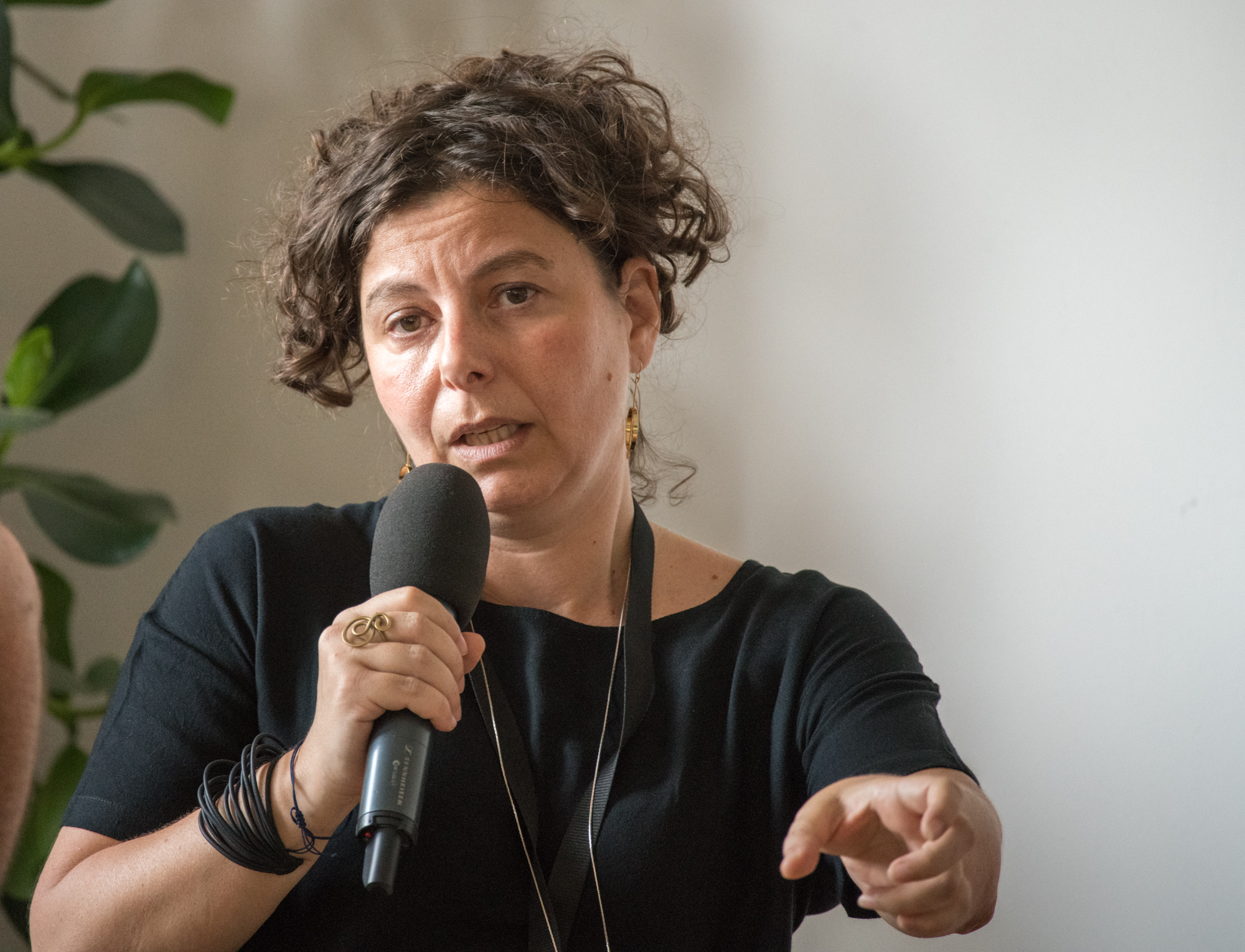
- Elli Papakonstantinou at the Festival der Regionen, 2019
- Born: 1973 (age 52–53); Athens, Greece
- Education: Aristotle University of Thessaloniki (BA), Royal Holloway, University of London (MA)
- Occupations: Stage director; librettist; translator; cultural manager

Elli Papakonstantinou (Greek: Έλλη Παπακωνσταντίνου; born 1973) is a Greek stage director in the areas of theatre and opera.

== Early life and education ==
Papakonstantinou was born in Athens in 1973. She earned a Bachelor of Arts degree at the Aristotle University of Thessaloniki. In 1995, she moved to the United Kingdom and completed a Master of Arts degree at Royal Holloway, University of London.

== Career ==
Papakonstantinou made her directorial debut with Lil Warren's Nine Lives, Ten Tales, which won First prize at the 1997 Edinburgh Fringe Festival. In 1999, she directed The Suppliants After Aeschylus After Kosovo, a reimagined version of Aeschylus’ The Suppliants written by the South African playwright Tamantha Hammerschlag at the Gilded Balloon during that year's edition of the Edinburgh Fringe Festival.

Papakonstantinou collaborated with V. Papavasiliou (Oedipus Rex, presented at the Rome Colosseum for the Sophocles 2000 Colosseum Festival).

Her staging of the Odyssey, titled ODC after Homer, was presented at the 2002 Edinburgh Fringe Festival. The production was also invited to the official Inauguration Ceremony of the Bibliotheca Alexandrina in Alexandria.

Papakonstantinou's Greek directorial debut was the Decameron of Women by Julia Voznesenskaya, an adaptation of Boccaccio's Decameron about six women in 1970s Soviet Union.

In 2005, she was a visiting fellow at the Seeger Center for Hellenic Studies at Princeton University.

Papakonstantinou was commissioned by European Capitals of Culture and by the Prague Quadrennial of Performance Design and Space in 2015.

She is the founder of the international company ODC Ensemble, as well as a Visiting CCRMA Scholar at Stanford University and a visiting scholar at Princeton University. She was awarded the Fulbright Artist's Award twice.

In 2011 she founded "Vyrsodepseio" (Greek: Βυρσοδεψείο, transl. 'Tannery'), a cultural venue for theatre performances, concerts, and exhibitions, which she directed until 2016.

Papakonstantinou directed an adaptation of A Winter's Tale by William Shakespeare at the Municipal Theater of Latsia. In 2012, she directed Woyzeck Quartet, based on Alban Berg's Wozzeck and Georg Büchner's Woyzeck, which premiered at the Athens & Epidaurus Festival. Commenting on a version of William Shakespeare's Richard II that Papakonstantinou presented at Vyrsodepseio, Scholar Xenia Georgopoulou remarked on "the similarities between the play and the political context" with the director stating "that her production [was] intended for a popular audience, not for the small social elite, which [had long been] the targeted audience."

== Later work ==
In May 2017, Papakonstantinou presented The Backstage of Revolution, a site-specific performance inspired by the French Revolution, as part of the official program of the Athens & Epidaurus Festival. Later that year, her newest piece, Stabat Parthenope, was staged at the Altofest in Naples.

Każin Barokk, an opera conceived, written, and directed by Papakonstantinou and commissioned by Valletta, was held at the Notre Dame Gate in Birgu, Malta, in September 2018.

In 2018, Papakonstantinou toured Europe with The Cave, based on Plato's allegory. The Cave was presented amongst other places at the Repertory Theatre, Birmingham (BE Festival) and the Aalborg Opera Festival. In December 2018, The Cave was awarded the International Music Theatre Now Award for the first production of new works.

In 2018, she received a Fulbright Artist's Award a second time, and was invited to serve as a visiting scholar for six months (October 2018 - April 2019) at the CCRMA – Center for Computer Research in Music and Acoustics, Stanford University, US. The new media cinematic opera Oedipus, Sex with Mum was Blinding, written and directed by Papakonstantinou, was performed in the USA in 2019.

In 2019, Papakonstantinou wrote and conceived The Kindly Ones, a theatre work drawing on Aeschylus’s Eumenides. The piece was originally commissioned by the Festival der Regionen and was developed after research in the archives of the Mauthausen Concentration Camp Memorial. It premiered at the Mauthausen site in July 2019, co-produced by Festival der Regionen and the La Strada Festival in Austria.

In 2020, she presented Traces of Antigone, written by Christina Ouzounidis, a live digital performance, conducted during COVID-19 lockdown. The performance won the AMAZONE 2020 award and was nominated for the Italian Critics Award, and continues its international tour both in digital and physical form. Her digital works Aède of the Ocean and Land and Hotel AntiOedipus were presented at festivals and organizations in multiple countries, such as the Paris Centre Pompidou's IRCAM or Rome's Romaeuropa Festival.

Papakonstantinou's ALKESTIS, a commission of the Royal Theatre of Sweden in collaboration with the Royal Swedish Opera, premiered on 2 December 2021 in Stockholm. She developed EROS, an international co-production with Ukraine's Nova Opera, supported by the Greek Ministry of Culture and the Ukrainian House Of Europe, which premiered in the spring of 2022 at Rotterdam's O. Festival.

Additionally, she sat on the board of directors of the Hellenic Broadcasting Corporation (ΕΡΤ: Ελληνική Ραδιοφωνία Τηλεόραση) and served as President of its Film Funding Board for two years.

She has been invited to teach courses and workshops at universities and schools such as Princeton University, the University of London, Stanford University, the University of Peloponnese, the Summer Academy of the National Theatre of Greece, and the University of Malta. She has also attended conferences around the world and has translated for the stage.

== Awards and distinctions ==
Year	AWARDS
1997	First Prize Award, Edinburgh Festival, UΚ
2004–05	Fulbright Artist's Award for conducting research at the Music & Advanced Media Lab of Princeton University, USA
2005	Stanley J. Seeger Visiting Fellowship, Princeton University, USA
2017	First Prize Award for BE Festival 2017 at the Repertory Theatre of Birmingham for the performance REVOLT ATHENΣ
2018–19	Fulbright Artist's Award and visiting scholarship at CCRMA, Stanford University, USA

== Publications ==
- The Outcry by Tennessee Williams, Sokoli-Kouledaki Editions, 2011 (co-translator with Athina Maximou)
- Greek Art in a State of Emergency, ACAR – ITI Action Committee For Artists Rights, 2015

== See also ==
- List of Greek women artists
