= S-75 Dvina =

S-75 Desna / V-750 SA-2 Guideline, SA-N-2 Guideline
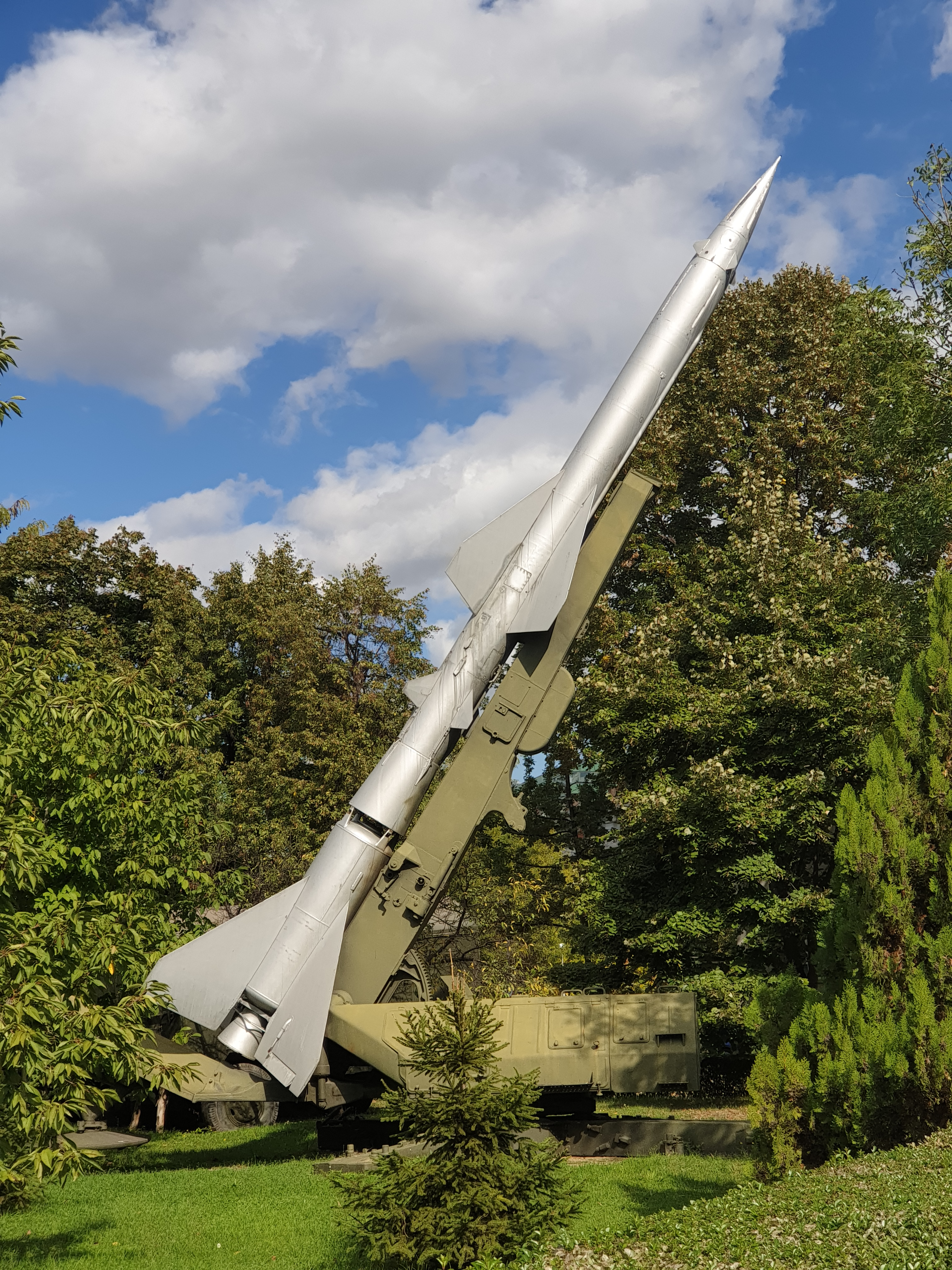
- S-75 Dvina in the National Museum of Military History, Sofia, Bulgaria
- Type: Strategic SAM system
- Place of origin: Soviet Union

Service history
- In service: 1957–present
- Used by: See list of present and former operators
- Wars: Vietnam War; Six-Day War; Indo-Pakistani War of 1965; Indo-Pakistani War of 1971; Yom Kippur War; Iran–Iraq War; Gulf War; Yugoslav Wars; War on terror; War in Abkhazia (1992–93); First Libyan Civil War; Syrian Civil War; Yemeni Civil War (2014–present); Saudi Arabian-led intervention in Yemen; Saudi–Yemeni border conflict (2015–present); Tigray War

Production history
- Designer: Raspletin KB-1 (head developer), Grushin MKB Fakel (missile developer), Lavochkin OKB
- Designed: 1953–1957
- Produced: 1957
- No. built: Approx 4,600 launchers produced
- Variants: SA-75 Dvina, S-75 Desna, S-75M Volkhov/Volga

Specifications (V-750)
- Mass: 2,300 kg (5,100 lb)
- Length: 10,600 mm (34 ft 9 in)
- Diameter: 700 mm (28 in)
- Warhead: Frag-HE
- Warhead weight: 195 kg (430 lb)
- Detonation mechanism: Prox, contact and command
- Propellant: Solid-fuel booster and a storable liquid-fuel upper stage
- Operational range: 45 km (28 mi)
- Flight altitude: 25,000 m (82,000 ft)
- Boost time: 5 seconds boost, then 20 seconds sustain
- Maximum speed: Mach 3.5 (4,100 km/h; 2,600 mph)
- Guidance system: Radio control command guidance
- Accuracy: 65 m (210 ft)
- Launch platform: Single rail, ground mounted (not mobile)

The S-75 (Russian: С-75; NATO reporting name SA-2 Guideline) is a Soviet-designed, high-altitude air defence system. It is built around a surface-to-air missile with command guidance. Following its first deployment in 1957 it became one of the most widely deployed air defence systems in history. It was produced in the People's Republic of China under the names HQ-1 (under licence) and HQ-2 (modified, named FT-2000A). Egyptian engineers produced a reverse-engineered S-75 with the name Tayir-as-Sabah.

The S-75 system scored the first destruction of an enemy aircraft by a surface-to-air missile with the shootdown of a Taiwanese Martin RB-57D Canberra over China on 7 October 1959, which was hit by a salvo of three V-750 (1D) missiles at an altitude of 20 km (66,000 ft). This success was credited to Chinese fighter aircraft at the time to keep the S-75 program secret.

This system first gained international fame when an S-75 battery, using the newer, longer-range, higher-altitude V-750VN (13D) missile was deployed in the 1960 U-2 incident, when it shot down the U-2 of Francis Gary Powers overflying the Soviet Union on May 1, 1960. The system was also deployed in Cuba during the Cuban Missile Crisis, when it shot down another U-2 (piloted by Rudolf Anderson) overflying Cuba on October 27, 1962, almost precipitating a nuclear war. North Vietnamese forces would use the S-75 extensively during the Vietnam War against US air power, such as in the defence of Hanoi and Haiphong. The SAM threat would lead the United States to develop tactics to counter the S-75, such as the Wild Weasel aircraft armed with anti-radiation missiles.

The system remains in limited service, with modified missiles being used by Russia as target missiles (RM; ракета мишень).

== History ==
=== Development ===
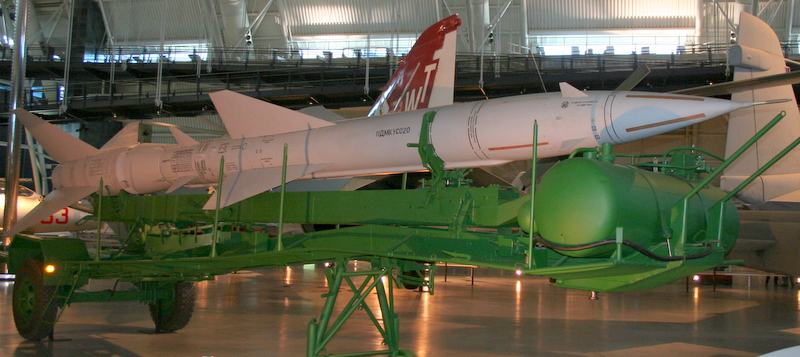
S-75 Guideline missile on display at the National Air and Space Museum

In the early 1950s, the United States Air Force rapidly accelerated its development of long-range jet bombers carrying nuclear weapons. The USAF program led to the deployment of Boeing B-47 Stratojet supported by aerial refueling aircraft to extend its range deep into the Soviet Union. The USAF quickly followed the B-47 with the development of the Boeing B-52 Stratofortress, which had greater range and payload than the B-47. The range, speed, and payload of these US bombers posed a significant threat to the Soviet Union in the event of a war between the two countries.

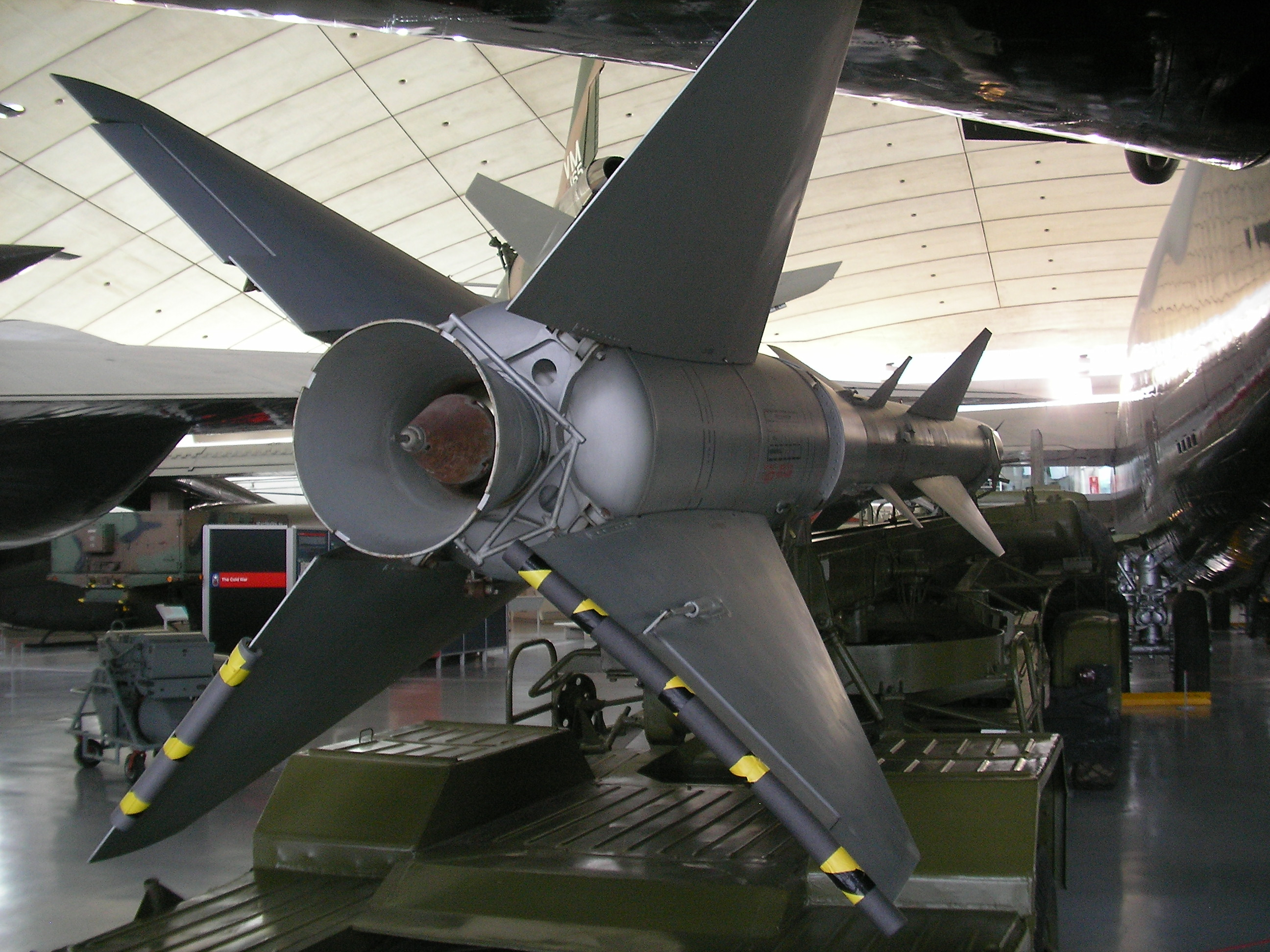
Rear view showing the solid-propellant booster nozzle, as displayed in Imperial War Museum Duxford

Consequently, the Soviets initiated the development of improved air defence systems. Although the Soviet Air Defence Forces had large numbers of anti-aircraft artillery (AAA), including radar-directed batteries, the limitations of guns versus high-altitude jet bombers were obvious. Therefore, the Soviet Air Defence Forces began the development of missile systems to replace the World War II-vintage gun defences.

In 1953, KB-2 began the development of what became the S-75 under the direction of Pyotr Grushin. This program focused on producing a missile which could bring down a large, non-maneuvering, high-altitude aircraft. As such it did not need to be highly maneuverable, merely fast and able to resist aircraft counter-measures. For such a pioneering system, development proceeded rapidly, and testing began a few years later. In 1957, the wider public first became aware of the S-75 when the missile was shown at that year's May Day parade in Moscow.

=== Initial deployment ===
Wide-scale deployment started in 1957, with various upgrades following over the next few years. The S-75 was never meant to replace the S-25 Berkut surface-to-air missile sites around Moscow, but it did replace high-altitude anti-aircraft guns, such as the 130 mm (5.1 in) KS-30 and 100 mm (3.9 in) KS-19. Between mid-1958 and 1964, US intelligence assets located more than 600 S-75 sites in the USSR. These sites tended to cluster around population centers, industrial complexes, and government control centers. A ring of sites was also located around likely bomber routes into the Soviet heartland. By the mid-1960s, the Soviet Union had ended the deployment of the S-75 with perhaps 1,000 operational sites.

In addition to the Soviet Union, several S-75 batteries were deployed during the 1960s in East Germany to protect Soviet forces stationed in that country. Later the system was sold to most Warsaw Pact countries and was provided to China, North Korea, and eventually, North Vietnam.

=== Employment ===
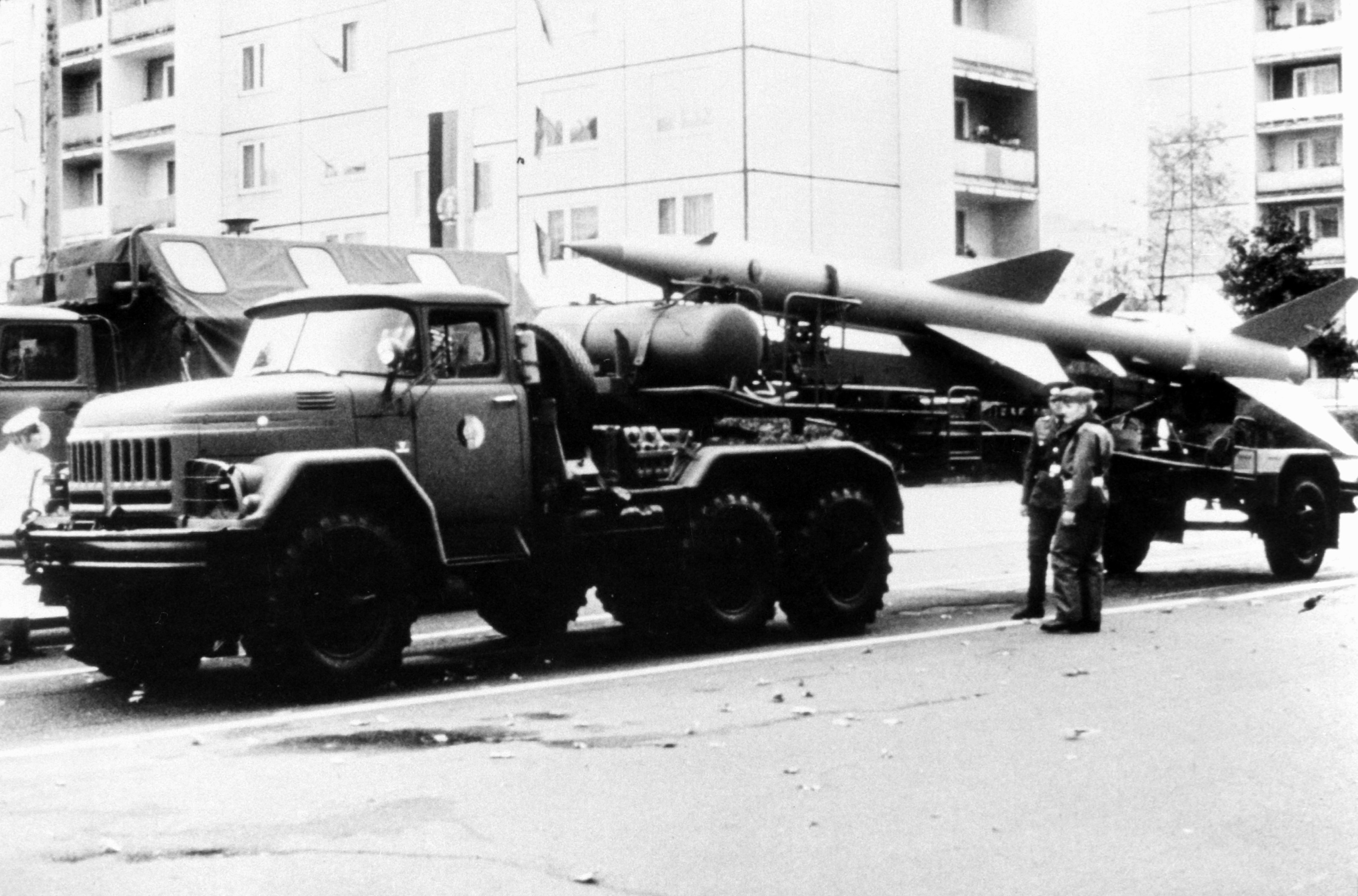
The S-75 in transport configuration

While the shooting down of Francis Gary Powers' U-2 in 1960 is the first publicized success for the S-75, the first aircraft shot down by the S-75 was a Taiwanese Martin RB-57D Canberra high-altitude reconnaissance aircraft. The aircraft was hit by a Chinese-operated S-75 site near Beijing on October 7, 1959. Over the next few years, the Taiwanese ROCAF would lose several aircraft to the S-75, both RB-57s and various drones. On May 1, 1960, Gary Powers' U-2 was shot down while flying over the testing site near Sverdlovsk. The first missile destroyed the U-2, and a further 13 were also fired, hitting a pursuing high-altitude MiG-19. The downing of the U-2 led to the U-2 Crisis of 1960. Additionally, Chinese S-75s downed five ROCAF-piloted U-2s.

During the Cuban Missile Crisis, a U-2 piloted by USAF Major Rudolf Anderson was shot down over Cuba by an S-75 in October 1962.

In 1965, North Vietnam asked for assistance against American airpower, since their own air-defence system lacked the ability to shoot down aircraft flying at high altitude. After some discussion it was agreed to supply the PAVN with the S-75. The decision was not made lightly, because it greatly increased the chances that one would fall into US hands for study. Site preparation started early in the year, and the US detected the program almost immediately on 5 April 1965.

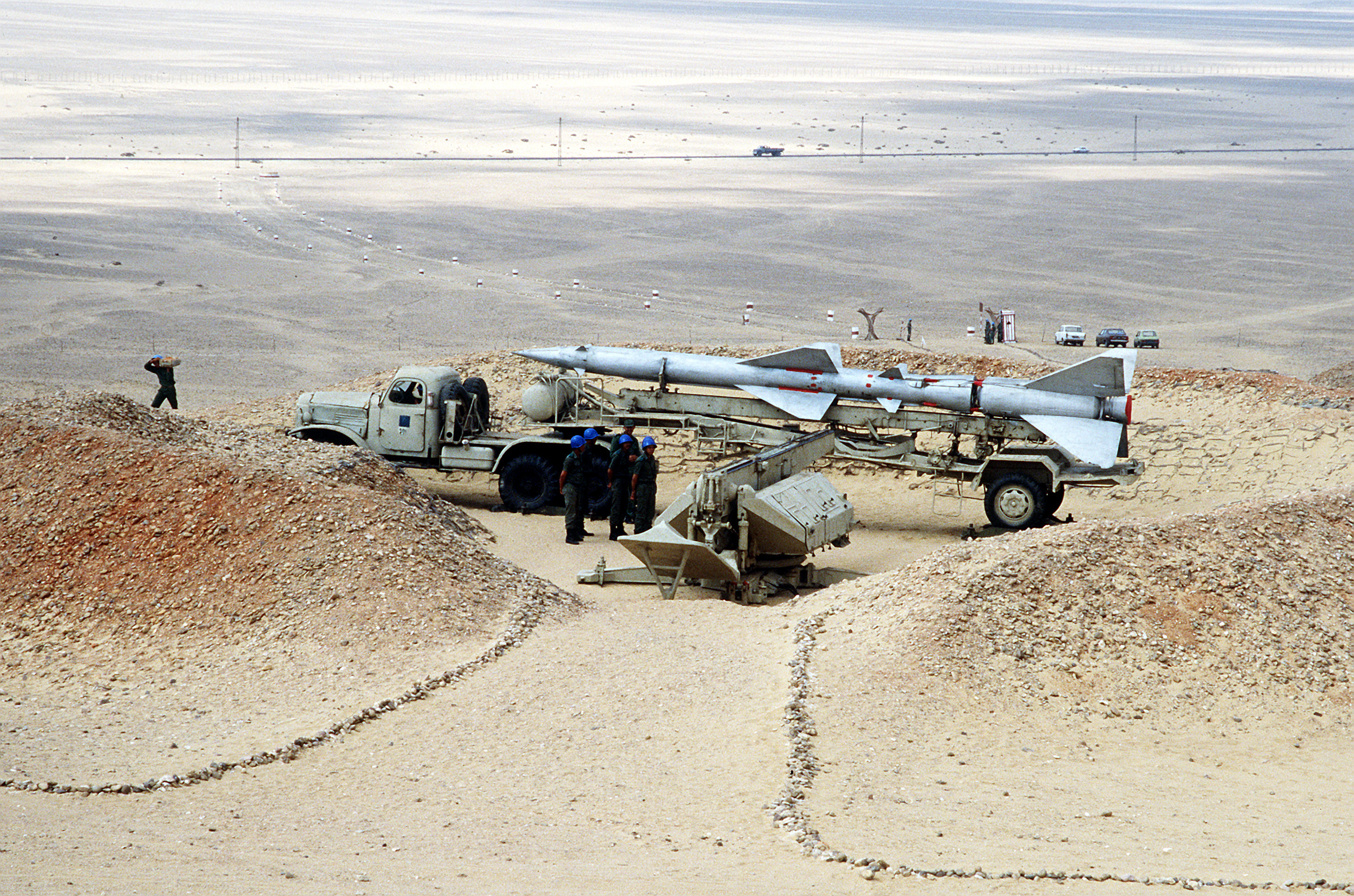
Egyptian S-75 System in 1985

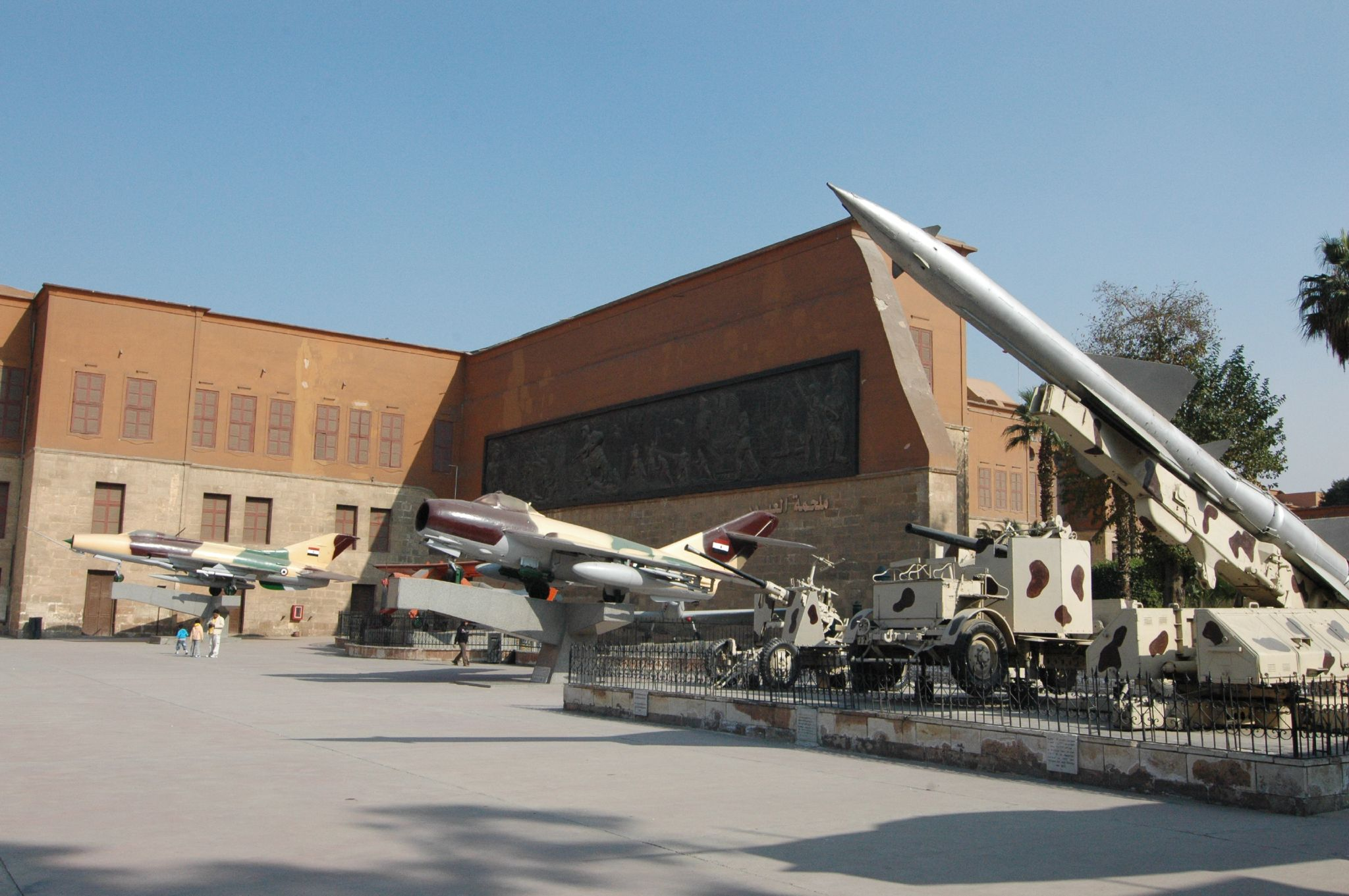
Egyptian S-75 Dvina in the Egyptian National Military Museum

On 24 July 1965, a USAF F-4C aircraft was shot down by an S-75. Three days later, the US responded with Operation Iron Hand to attack the other sites before they could become operational. Most of the S-75 were deployed around the Hanoi-Haiphong area and were off-limits to attack (as were local airfields) for political reasons.

On 8 September 1965, during the 1965 Indo-Pakistani war, an Indian S-75 Dvina was fired at an unidentified target believed to have been on a night mission above Ghaziabad near Delhi during the height of a paratrooper scare. Subsequent news reports would claim the destruction of a Pakistani C-130 west of Delhi, showing a photograph of the wreckage of the self-destructed missile as evidence of airplane wreckage. According to Indian sources, no Pakistani aircraft penetrated so deeply into Indian territory.

The missile system was used widely throughout the world, especially in the Middle East, where Egypt and Syria used them to defend against the Israeli Air Force, with the air defence net accounting for the majority of the downed Israeli aircraft. The last success seems to have occurred during the War in Abkhazia (1992–1993), when Georgian missiles shot down a Russian Sukhoi Su-27 fighter near Gudauta on March 19, 1993.

During the siege of Bihać, in the Bosnian War (1992-1995), Serb forces from Krajina fired at least three S-75 in the ground-to-ground mode at the Bosnian city of Cazin. In the Yemeni Civil War (2015-present), Houthis modified some of their S-75 into surface-to-surface ballistic missiles to attack Saudi bases with them.

=== War in Vietnam: Countermeasures and counter-countermeasures ===
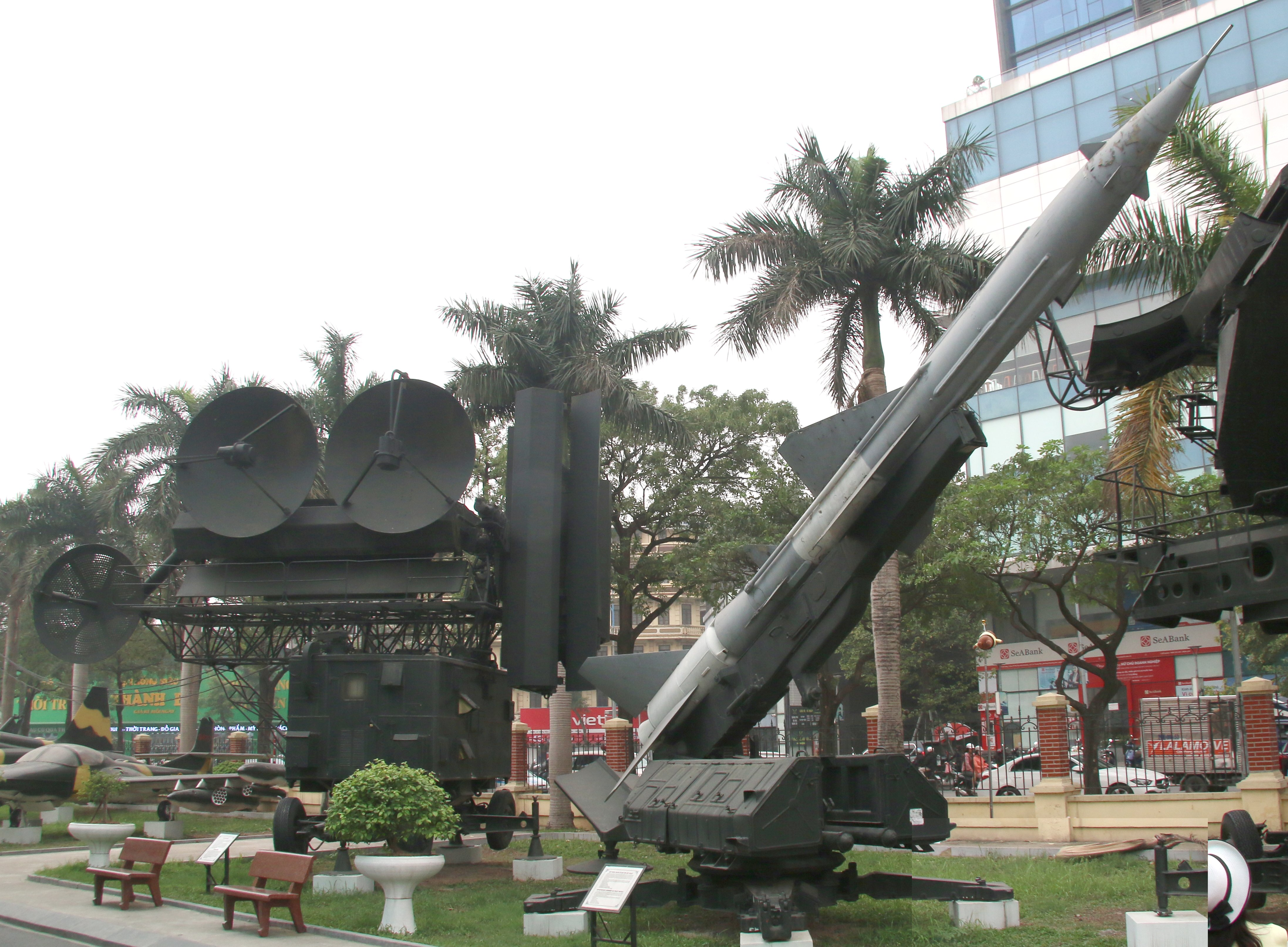
A missile launcher and fire-control radar station being exhibited in Vietnam Air Defence - Air Force Museum.

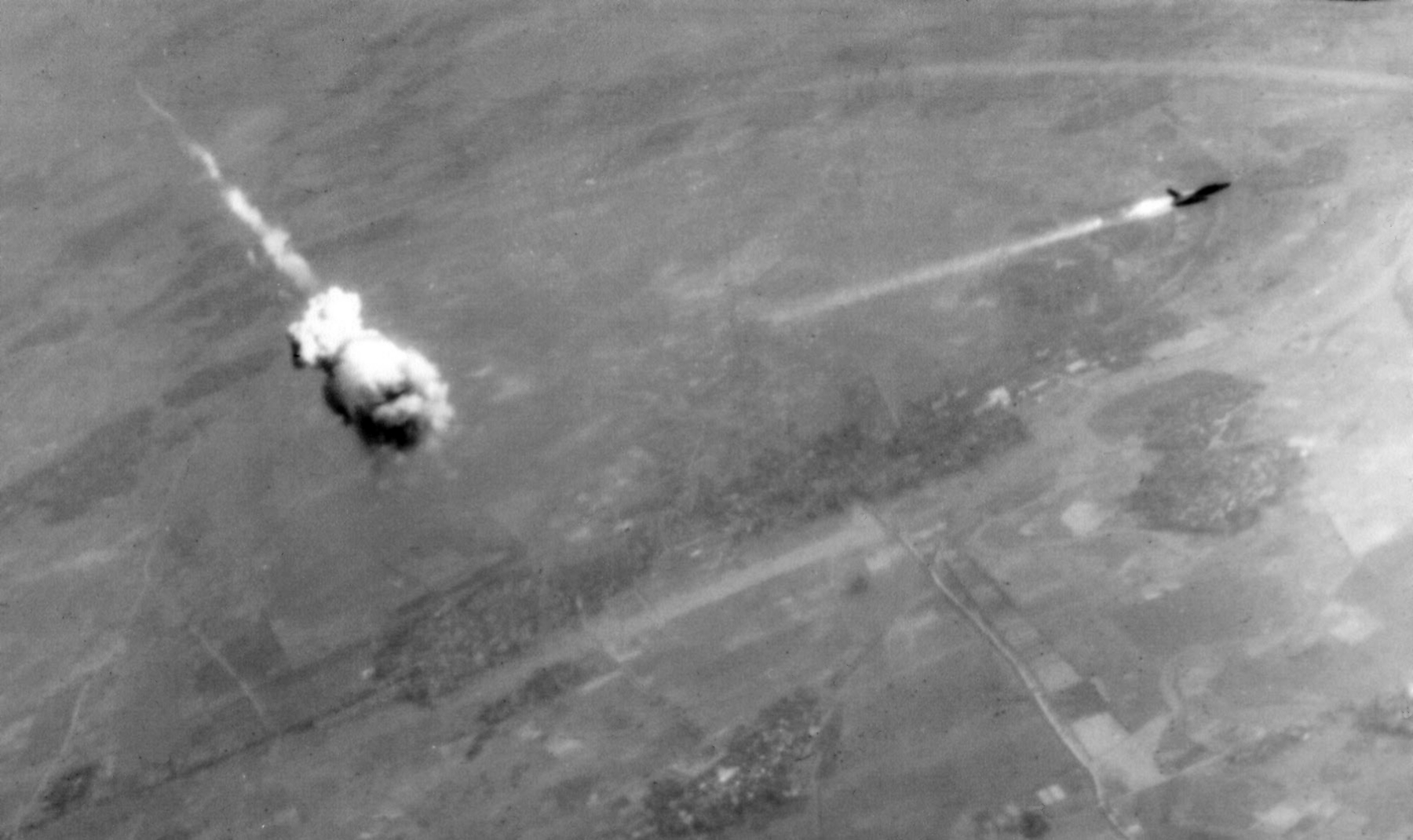
An F-105D hit by an S-75 missile

Between 1964 and early 1965 the Vietnamese had nothing to threaten American pilots in the air. U.S aircraft flew at an altitude of 4 to 5 kilometres (13,000 to 16,000 ft), and the Vietnamese anti-aircraft guns were unable to reach them. However, after an S-75 shot down a US F-4 Phantom aircraft, the US bombers began to descend below 3 kilometres (10,000 ft), below the minimum operational height of the Dvina. This brought them within the reach of Vietnamese anti-aircraft guns.

On July 24, 1965, four US Air Force McDonnell F-4C Phantoms took part in an airstrike against the Điện Biên Phủ munitions storage depot and the Lang Chi munitions factory west of Hanoi. One was shot down and three damaged by S-75s. This was the first time US aircraft were attacked by SAMs during the Vietnam War.

Two days later President Johnson gave the order to attack known S-75 positions outside the 48-kilometre (30 mi) exclusion zone. On the morning of July 27, 48 F-105s participated in the strike, Operation Spring High. The Vietnamese knew US aircraft were coming, and set up many 23 mm (0.91 in) and 37 mm (1.5 in) anti-aircraft guns at the two SAM sites. These anti-aircraft guns were lethal at close range. The Vietnamese shot down six aircraft and more than half of the remaining US aircraft suffered damage from ground fire. However, the Vietnamese had replaced the SAMs with white-painted bundles of bamboo. Operation Spring High had destroyed two decoy targets for the loss of six aircraft and five pilots.

Between 1965 and 1966 the US developed countermeasures to the S-75 threat. The Navy soon had the AGM-45 Shrike anti-radiation air-to-surface missile in service and mounted their first offensive strike on a site in October 1965. The Air Force fitted B-66 bombers with powerful jammers (which blinded the early warning radars) and developed smaller jamming pods for fighters (which denied range information to enemy radars). Later developments included the Wild Weasel aircraft, which were fitted with AGM-45 Shrike missile systems made to home in on the radar from the threat.

The Soviets and Vietnamese were able to adapt to some of these tactics. The USSR upgraded the radar several times to improve electronic countermeasure (ECM) resistance. They also introduced a passive guidance mode, whereby the tracking radar could lock onto the jamming signal itself and guide missiles directly towards the jamming source. This also meant the SAM site's tracking radar could be turned off, which prevented Shrikes from homing in on it. New tactics were developed to combat the Shrike. One of them was to point the radar to the side and then turn it off briefly. Since the Shrike was a relatively primitive anti-radiation missile, it would follow the beam away from the radar and then simply crash when it lost the signal (after the radar was turned off). SAM crews could briefly illuminate a hostile aircraft to see if the target was equipped with a Shrike. If the aircraft fired a missile, the Shrike could be neutralized with the side-pointing technique without sacrificing any S-75s. Another tactic was a "false launch" in which missile guidance signals were transmitted without a missile having been launched. This could distract enemy pilots, or even occasionally cause them to drop ordnance prematurely to lighten their aircraft enough to dodge the nonexistent missile.

At the same time, evasive maneuvers were used, and intensive bombardments of identified SAM firing positions were organized. Under these conditions, camouflage and radio silence became especially important. After combat launches, an anti-aircraft missile division was to leave the area immediately, otherwise it would be destroyed by a bombing attack. Until December 1965, according to American data, eight S-75M systems were destroyed, although sometimes American aircraft bombed dummy positions equipped with decoy missiles made of bamboo. Soviet and Vietnamese calculations claimed the destruction of 31 aircraft; the Americans acknowledged the loss of 13 aircraft. According to the memoirs of Soviet advisers, on average an anti-aircraft missile unit destroyed 5-6 American aircraft before being put out of action.

Despite these advances, the US was able to come up with effective ECM packages for the B-52E and later models. When the B-52s flew large-scale raids against Hanoi and Haiphong over an eleven-day period in December 1972, 266 S-75 missiles were fired, resulting in the loss of 15 of the bombers and damage to numerous others. The ECM proved to be generally effective, but repetitive USAF flight tactics early in the bombing campaign increased the vulnerability of the bombers and the North Vietnamese missile crews adopted a practice of firing large S-75 salvos to overwhelm the planes' defensive countermeasures (see Operation Linebacker II). By the conclusion of the Linebacker II campaign, the shootdown rate of the S-75 against the B-52s was 7.52% (15 B-52s were shot down, 5 B-52s were heavily damaged for 266 missiles).

However, some of the U.S aircraft which "crashed in flight accidents" in fact were lost due to S-75 missiles. When landing at an airfield in Thailand, one B-52 that had been heavily damaged by a SAM rolled off the runway and exploded on mines installed around the airfield to protect from the guerrillas; only one crewman survived. Subsequently, this B-52 was counted as "crashed in flight accidents". According to Dana Drenkowski and Lester W. Grau, the number of US aircraft confirmed by themselves as lost is uncorroborated since the US figures are also suspect. If a plane was badly damaged but managed to land, the USAF did not count as a loss even if it was too damaged to fly again.

During the Vietnam war, the Soviet Union delivered 95 S-75 systems and 7,658 missiles to the Vietnamese. 6,806 missiles were launched or removed by outdating. According to the Vietnamese, the S-75 shot down 1,046 aircraft, or 31% of all downed US aircraft. By comparison, air-defense guns brought down 60% and 9% were shot down by MiG fighters. The higher rate of anti-aircraft artillery is partially caused by the fact that gun units received data from the S-75 radar stations that significantly improved their effectiveness.

=== Soviet-Afghan war ===
At least one Soviet SA-2 system was deployed in Kabul in summer 1980.

=== Replacement systems ===
Soviet Air Defence Forces started to replace the S-75 with the vastly superior S-300 system in the 1980s. The S-75 remains in widespread service throughout the world, with some level of operational ability in 35 countries. In the 2000s, Vietnam and Egypt are tied for the largest deployments at 280 missiles each, while North Korea has 270. The Chinese also deploy the HQ-2, an upgrade of the S-75, in relatively large numbers.

== Description ==
=== Soviet doctrinal organization ===
The Soviet Union used a fairly standard organizational structure for S-75 units. Other countries that have employed the S-75 may have modified this structure. Typically, the S-75 is organized into a regimental structure with three subordinate battalions. The regimental headquarters will control the early-warning radars and coordinate battalion actions. The battalions will contain several batteries with their associated acquisition and targeting radars.

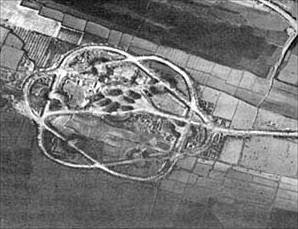
North Vietnamese S-75 site. The typical hexagonal pattern made the sites easy to spot from the air. The Vietnamese later abandoned the layout for this reason.

=== Site layout ===
Each battalion will typically have six, semi-fixed, single-rail launchers for their V-750 missiles positioned approximately 60 to 100 m (200 to 330 ft) apart from each other in a hexagonal "flower" pattern, with radars and guidance systems placed in the center. This arrangement was needed because the early radar systems had a field-of-view around 20 degrees wide, and the guidance system demanded the missiles be launched into its view. To allow this, the missiles were spaced out every 60 degrees on launcher platforms that could be rotated to point in the same general direction. The system would then launch the (remaining) missile that was closest to the radar's line of sight.

Typically another six missiles are stored on tractor-trailers near the center of the site. The flower-like road arrangement was used to allow the trailers to access the six launchers without having to negotiate tight corners. However, this layout was also easily identified from reconnaissance photos, which allowed the sites to be avoided or attacked.

=== Missile ===
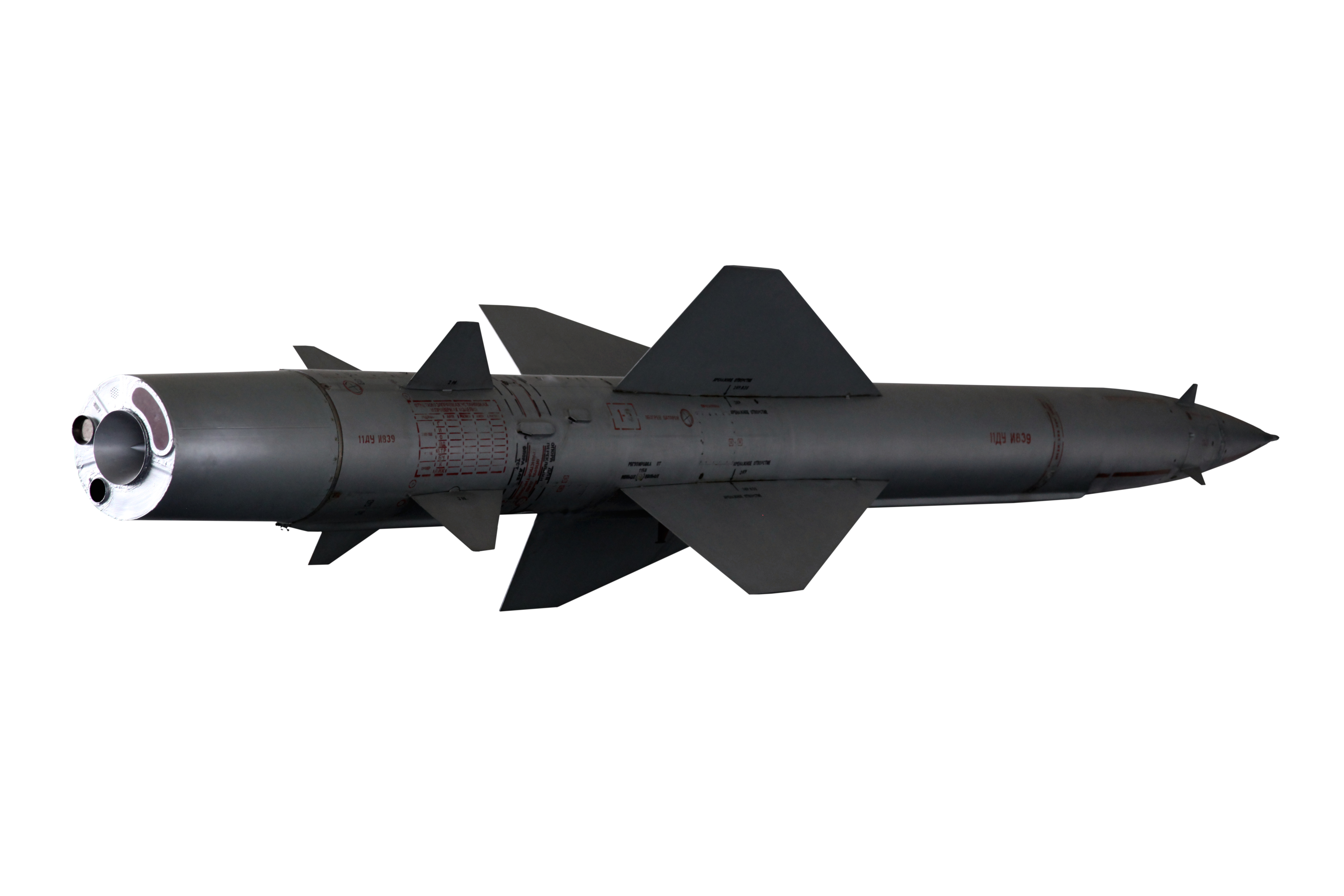
Second stage of an S-75

The V-750 is a two-stage missile consisting of a solid-fuel booster and a storable liquid-fuel upper stage, which burns AK-20 (based on red fuming nitric acid) as the oxidizer and TG-02 (toxic mixture of 50-52% triethylamine and 48-50% isomeric xylidine) as the fuel. The booster fires for about 4–5 seconds and the main engine for about 22 seconds, by which time the missile is traveling at about Mach 3 (2,200 mph). The booster mounts four large, cropped-delta wing fins that have small control surfaces in their trailing edges to control roll. The upper stage has smaller cropped-deltas near the middle of the airframe, with a smaller set of control surfaces at the extreme rear and (in most models) much smaller fins on the nose.

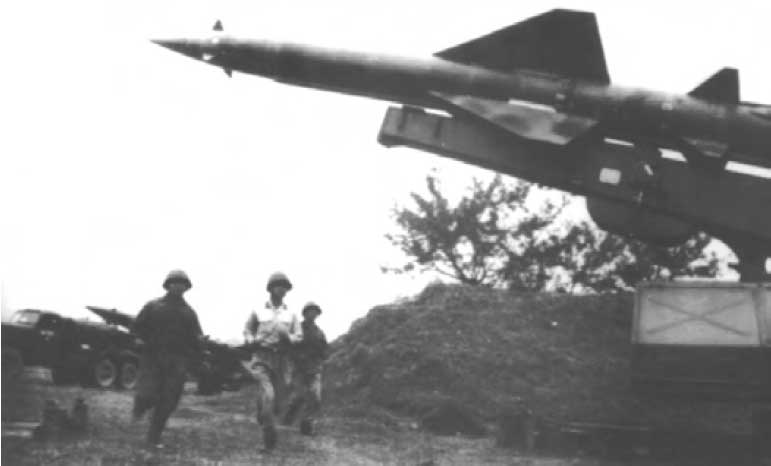
North Vietnamese S-75 missile prepare to fire at American aircraft

The missiles are guided using radio control signals (sent on one of three channels) from the guidance computers at the site. The earlier S-75 models received their commands via two sets of four small antennas in front of the forward fins while the D model and later models used four much larger strip antennas running between the forward and middle fins. The guidance system at an S-75 site can handle only one target at a time, but it can direct three missiles against it. Additional missiles could be fired against the same target after one or more missiles of the first salvo had completed their run, freeing the radio channel.

The missile typically mounts a 195 kg (430 lb) fragmentation warhead, with proximity, contact, and command fusing. The warhead has a lethal radius of about 65 m (200 ft) at lower altitudes, but at higher altitudes the thinner atmosphere allows for a wider radius of up to 250 m (800 ft). The missile itself is accurate to about 75 m (250 ft), which explains why two were typically fired in a salvo. One version, the S-75AK, mounted a 295 kg (650 lb) nuclear warhead of an estimated 15 kiloton yield or a conventional warhead of similar weight.

Typical range for the missile is about 45 km (28 mi), with a maximum altitude around 20,000 m (66,000 ft). The radar and guidance system imposed a fairly long short-range cutoff of about 500 to 1,000 m (1,600 to 3,300 ft), making them fairly safe for engagements at low level.

=== Table of SA-2 / S-75 missiles ===
S-75 missiles and variants
Missile	Factory index	Description
V-750	1D	Firing range 7–29 km (4–20 mi); Firing altitude 3,000–23,000 m (10,000–75,000 ft)
V-750V	11D	Firing range 7–29 km (4–20 mi); Firing altitude 3,000–25,000 m (10,000–82,000 ft); Weight 2,163 kg (4,769 lb); Length 10,726 mm (35 ft 2.3 in); Warhead weight 190 kg (420 lb); Diameter 500 mm (20 in) / 654 mm (25.7 in)
V-750VK	11D	Modernized missile
V-750VM	11DM	Missile for firing to aircraft - jammer
V-750VM	11DU	Modernized missile
V-750VM	11DА	Modernized missile
V-750M	20ТD	No specific information available
V-750SM	-	No specific information available
V-750VN	13D	Firing range 7–29 km (4.3–18.0 mi) / 7–34 km (4.3–21.1 mi); Firing altitude 3,000–25,000 m (10,000–82,000 ft) / 3,000–27,000 m (10,000–89,000 ft); Length 10,841 mm (35 ft 6.8 in)
-	13DА	Missile with new warhead weight 191 kg (421 lb)
V-750АK	-	No specific information available
V-753	13DM	Missile from naval SAM system M-2 Volkhov-M (SA-N-2 Guideline)
V-755	20D	Firing range 7–43 km (4–27 mi); Firing altitude 3,000–30,000 m (10,000–98,000 ft); Weight 2,360–2,396 kg (5,203–5,282 lb); Length 10,778 mm (35 ft 4.3 in); Warhead weight 196 kg (432 lb)
V-755	20DP	Missile for firing on passive flight-line, Firing range 7–45 km (4–28 mi) active, 7–56 km (4–35 mi) passive; Firing altitude 300–30,000 m (1,000–98,000 ft) / 300–35,000 m (1,000–115,000 ft)
V-755	20DА	Missile with expired guarantee period and remodeled to 20DS
V-755OV	20DO	Missile for taking air samples
V-755U	20DS	Missile with selective block for firing to target in low altitude (under 200 m or 660 ft); Firing altitude 100–30,000 m (300–98,400 ft) / 100–35,000 m (300–114,800 ft)
V-755U	20DSU	Missile with selective block for firing to target in low altitude (under 200 m or 660 ft) and shortening time preparation missile to fire; Firing altitude 100–30,000 m (300–98,400 ft) / 100–35,000 m (300–114,800 ft)
V-755U	20DU	Missile with shortening time preparation missile to fire
V-759	5Ja23 (5V23)	Firing range 6–56 km (4–35 mi) / 6–60 km (4–37 mi) / 6–66 km (4–41 mi); Firing altitude 100–30,000 m (300–98,400 ft) / 100–35,000 m (300–114,800 ft); Weight 2,406 kg (5,304 lb); Length 10,806 mm (35 ft 5.4 in); Warhead weight 197–201 kg (434–443 lb)
V-760	15D	Missile with nuclear warhead
V-760V	5V29	Missile with nuclear warhead
V-750IR	-	Missile with pulse radiofuse
V-750N	-	Test missile
V-750P	-	Experimental missile - with rotate wings
V-751	KM	Experimental missile - flying laboratory
V-752	-	Experimental missile - boosters at the sides
V-754	-	Experimental missile - with semi-active homing head
V-757	17D	Experimental Missile - with scramjet
-	18D	Experimental Missile - with scramjet
V-757Kr	3M10	Experimental Missile - version for 2K11 Krug (SA-4 Ganef)
V-758 (5 JaGG)	22D	Experimental Missile - three-stage missile; Weight 3,200 kg (7,100 lb); Speed Mach 4.8 (3,500 mph)
Korshun	-	Target missile
RM-75MV	-	Target missile - for low altitude
RM-75V	-	Target missile - for high altitude
Sinitsa-23	5Ja23	Target missile
Qaher-1	-	Modified surface-to-surface ballistic missile version developed by Houthis

=== Radar ===
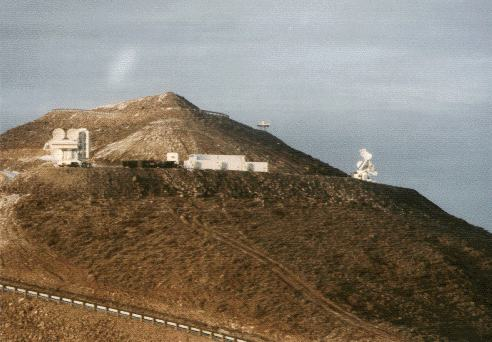
Fan Song radar (left) and a Low Blow to the right. This is a later model SNR-75 with the additional parabolic transmitters.

The S-75 typically uses the P-12 early warning radar (also known by its NATO codename, "Spoon Rest"), which has a range of about 275 km (171 mi). The P-12 provides early detection of incoming aircraft, which are then handed off to the acquisition radars at the missile sites. Regimental headquarters also include a P-12, as well as a P-15 long-range C-band radar and PRV-11 height-finder. Information from these radars is sent from the regiment down to the battalion P-12 operators to allow them to coordinate their searches. The earliest S-75 installations used a P-10 radar in place of the P-12, which was replaced in Soviet use but can still be found in older installations.

The tracking radar was the SNR-75, developed from the earlier B-200 multi-channel radar from the S-25 Berkut missile system deployed around Moscow. These used three separate antennas mounted to the top of a large operator's cabin, and the entire system rotated for search and tracking. One of the three antennas, the P-16 on the far left, used a small parabolic reflector to send commands to the missiles in flight. Using time division multiplexing, it could guide three missiles at the same time, albeit all at a single target. To the right of the P-16, as seen from the front, was the P-11 above the cabin and then P-12 on the far right (not to be confused with the P-12 radar). The latter two were identical Lewis scanner systems, the P-11 scanning horizontally and the P-12 vertically. They operated on different frequencies, using separate cavity magnetrons.

The Lewis scanner offered about 20 degrees of scanning, so the system had to be aimed in the general direction of the target in order to be seen. The beam width was a relatively wide 7 degrees, which demanded assistance to produce an accurate location, especially at long range. The output of the two were sent to separate B-scopes which were used to accurately center the target. Because the scanning was automatic, it also showed any other targets in the same general line-of-sight, and the operators could easily switch from one target to another. The launchers followed the rotation of the cabin to keep them aligned with the target.

Automated systems calculated the rough location of the missile during flight, and used range gates to filter out other objects on a timed basis. This allowed the single antenna system to measure the location of both the missile and the target, unlike its US counterpart, the Nike Ajax, which used separate radars. The guidance system had two modes. In automatic command-to-the-line-of-sight, or ACLOS, the missile was sent commands to keep it directly aligned with the target blip. This meant the missile could not "lead" the target, and was useful only for short-range shots. For longer range, the system calculated the proper lead and produced an elevation and azimuth and kept the missile on that line instead. Due to the scanning range, this allowed a maximum of 10 degrees of lead.

With the deployment of the upgraded Desna and S-75M Volkhov versions, the missile range increased to the point where the wide beams of the Lewis scanners was could no longer accurately measure angles at the longest ranges. To address this, two additional parabolic antennas were added above and in front of the P-11. These generated very narrow beams, which were then received on the existing scanners. The system could switch between the two for broadcast to allow a wide-angle view for initial detection, and then switching to the narrower ~1.5 degree beam for tracking. This improved the minimum effective range from about 60 km to 75 against typical targets.

The radars were pulse-type and easily jammed by broadcasting false pulses that would make range determination difficult. The system included a manual range input to address this; in the presence of jamming the operator could directly input their estimated range to allow the automated system to continue generating reasonably accurate guidance. However, the use of magnetrons as the signals source eliminated the possibility of providing any frequency diversity in operation, which made the detection of the system much simpler and provided ample warning time and jamming opportunities. The US and UK deployed a number of jammers against the system, using more sophisticated techniques like range gate pull-off which could confuse the side of the system tracking the missile, and angle deception jamming against the system tracking the aircraft.

The later models added new anti-jamming systems. The primary system was a narrow-band filter that removed any broadband noise, combined with a second set of transmitters that would be used in the case of spot jamming. Doppler measurement was used to filter out chaff. After experience in the Vietnam War, several additional systems were added, including filters on the missile tracking side to reject signals with the wrong Doppler shift for the estimated speed of the missile at that point, as well as a more powerful transponder on the missile to avoid it being jammed.

=== Major variants ===
Upgrades to anti-aircraft missile systems typically combine improved missiles, radars, and operator consoles. Usually missile upgrades drive changes to other components to take advantage of the missile's improved performance. Therefore, when the Soviets introduced a new S-75, it was paired with an improved radar to match the missile's greater range and altitude.

- S-75 Dvina (Двина) (NATO codename SA-2) with Fan Song-A guidance radar and V-750 or V-750V missiles. Initial deployment began in 1957. The combined missile and booster was 10.6 m (35 ft) long, with a booster having a diameter of 0.65 m (26 in), and the missile a diameter of 0.5 m (20 in). Launch weight is 2,287 kg (5,042 lb). The missile has a maximum effective range of 30 km (19 mi), a minimum range of 8 km (5.0 mi), and an intercept altitude envelope of between 450 and 25,000 m (1,480 and 82,020 ft).
- S-75M-2 Volkhov-M (Russian Волхов - Volkhov River) (NATO codename SA-N-2A): Naval version of the A model fitted to the Sverdlov Class cruiser Dzerzhinski. Generally considered unsuccessful and not fitted to any other ships.
- S-75 Desna (Russian Десна - Desna River) (NATO codename SA-2B). This version featured upgraded Fan Song-B radars with V-750VK and V-750VN missiles. This second deployment version entered service in 1959. The missiles were slightly longer than the A versions, at 10,800 mm (35.4 ft), due to a more powerful booster. The Desna could engage targets at altitudes between 500 and 30,000 m (1,600 and 98,400 ft) and ranges up to 34 km (21 mi).

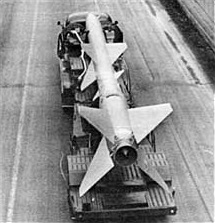
V-750 missile in transit

- S-75M Volkhov (NATO codename SA-2C). Once again, the new model featured an upgraded radar, the Fan Song-C, mated to an improved V-750M missile. The improved Volkhov was deployed in 1961. The V-750M was externally identical to the V-750VK/V-750VN, but it had improved performance for range up to 43 km (27 mi) and reduced lower altitude limits of 400 m (1,300 ft).
- S-75SM (NATO codename SA-2D); Fan Song-E radar and V-750SM missiles. The V-750SM differed significantly from previous versions in having new antennas and a longer barometric nose probe. Several other differences were associated with the sustainer motor casing. The missile is 10,800 mm (35.4 ft) long and has the same body diameters and warhead as the V-75M, but the weight is increased to 2,450 kg (5,400 lb). The effective maximum range is 43 km (27 mi), the minimum range is 6 km (3.7 mi), and the intercept altitude envelope is between 250 and 25,000 m (820 and 82,020 ft). Improved aircraft counter measures led to the development of the Fan Song-E with its better antennas which could cut through heavy jamming.
- S-75AK (NATO codename SA-2E): Fan Song-E radar and V-750AK missiles. Similar rocket to the V-750SM, but with a bulbous warhead section lacking the older missile's forward fins. The S-75AK is 11,200 mm (36.7 ft) long, has a body diameter of 500 mm (20 in), and weighs 2,450 kg (5,400 lb) at launch. The missile can be fitted with either a command-detonated 15 kt nuclear warhead or a 295 kg (650 lb) conventional HE warhead.
- S-75SM (NATO codename SA-2F): Fan Song-F radar and V-750SM missiles. After watching jamming in Vietnam and the Six-Day War render the S-75 completely ineffective, the existing systems were quickly upgraded with a new radar system designed to help ignore wide-band scintillation jamming. The command system also included a home-on-jam mode to attack aircraft carrying strobe jammers, as well as a completely optical system (of limited use) when these failed. Fs were developed starting in 1968 and deployed in the USSR later that year, while shipments to Vietnam started in late 1970.
- SA-2 FC: Latest Chinese version. It can track six targets simultaneously and is able to control 3 missiles simultaneously.
- S-75M Volga (Russian С-75М Волга - Volga River). Version from 1995.
- Volkhov M-2 (NATO codename SA-N-2) naval variant
- M-3 (NATO codename SA-NX-2) (missile V-800, V-760/755) experimental variant with four short wrap-around boosters forward, like the Seaslug system from the UK.

As previously mentioned, most nations with S-75s have matched parts from different versions or third-party missile systems, or they have added locally produced components. This has created a wide variety of S-75 systems which meet local needs.

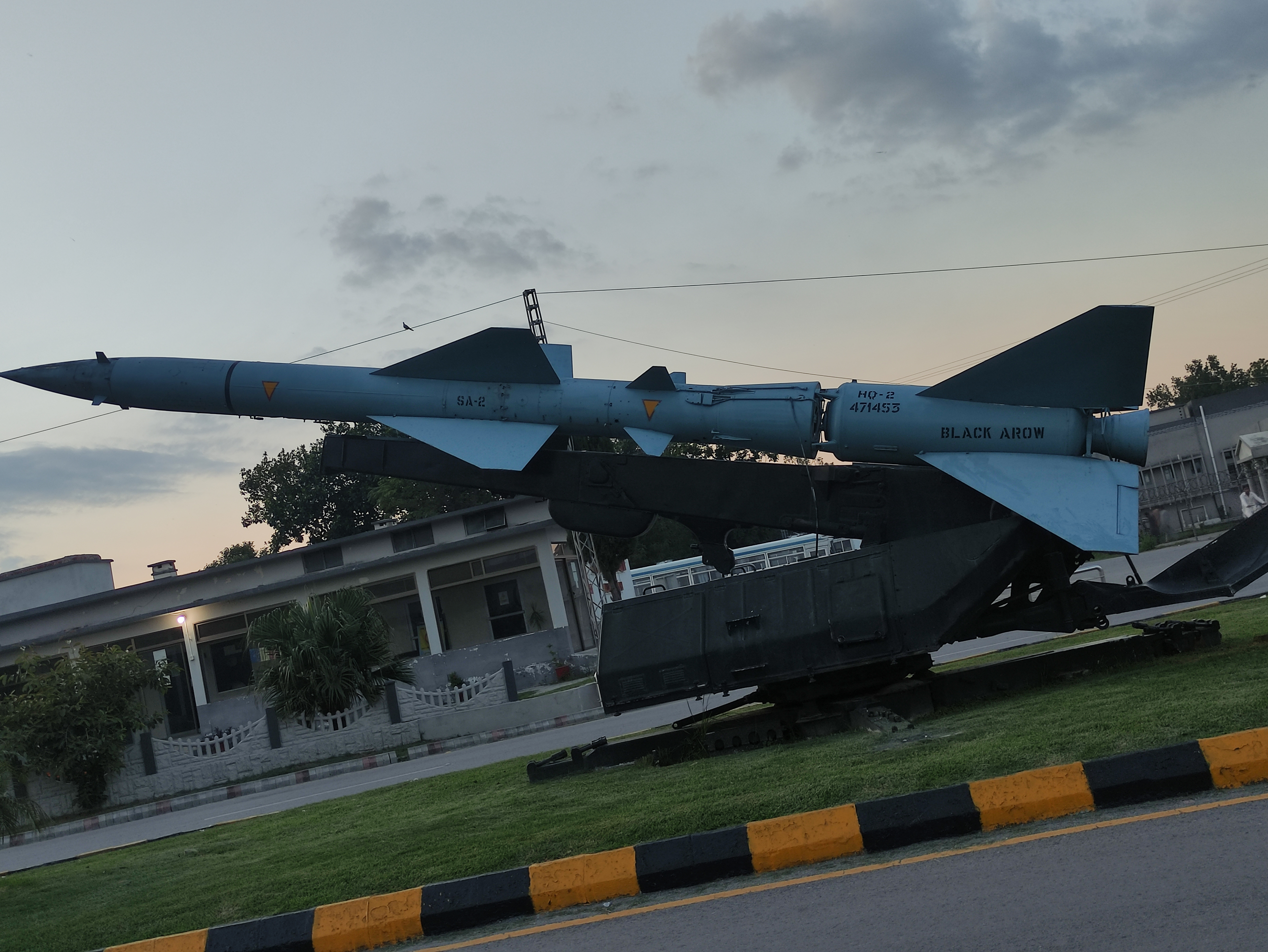
HQ-2B "Black Arrow" of the Pakistan Air Force now on display at Rawalpindi

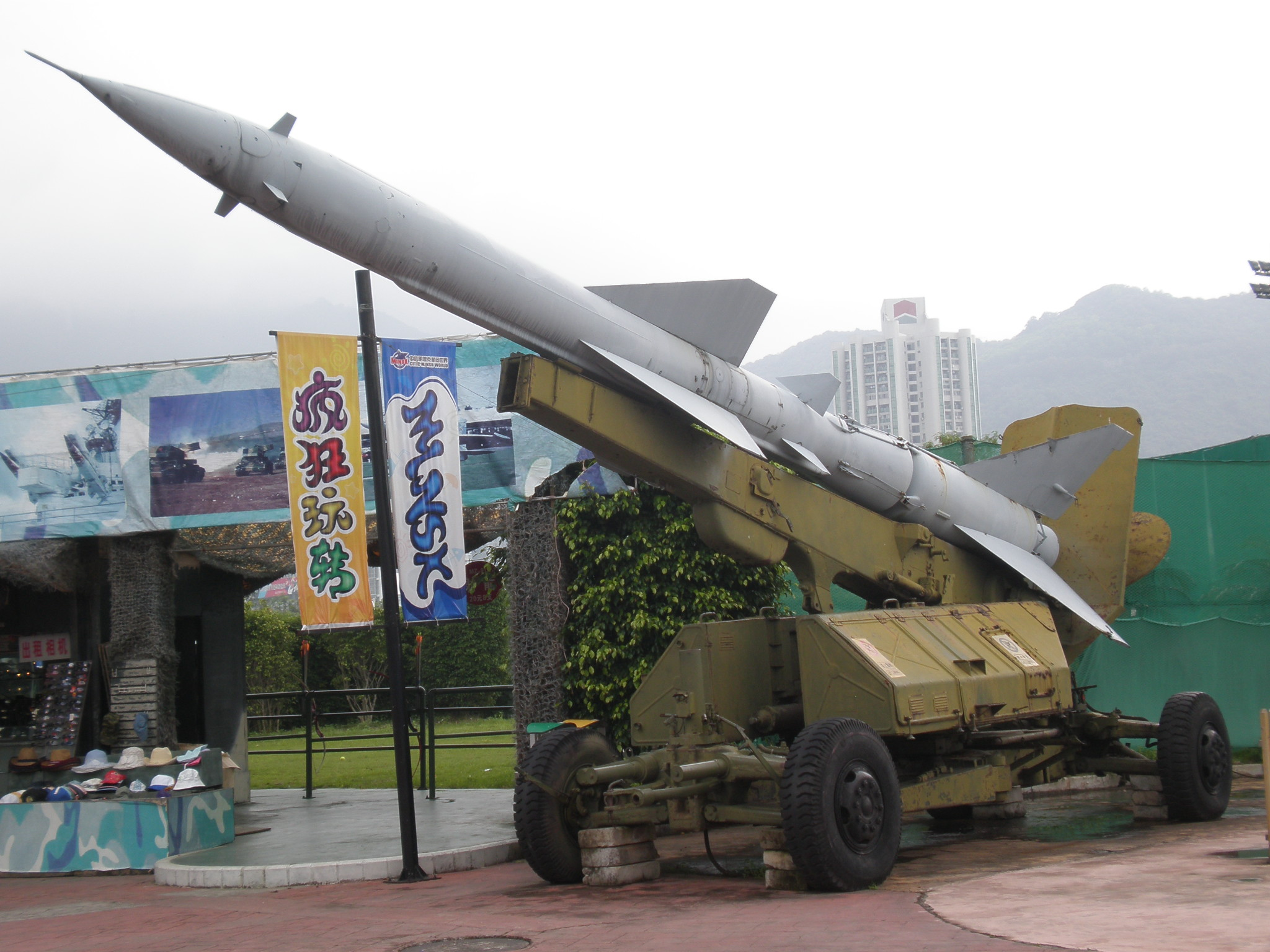
An HQ-2 on display at Minsk World in Shenzhen, China

- HQ-1 (Hong Qi, Red Flag): Chinese variant with additional ECCM electronics to counter the System-12 ECM aboard U-2s flown by the Republic of China Air Force Black Cat Squadron.
- HQ-2: Upgraded HQ-1 with additional ECCM capability to counter the System-13 ECM aboard U-2s flown by Republic of China Air Force Black Cat Squadron. Upgraded HQ-2s remain in service today, and the latest version utilizes Passive electronically scanned array radar designated SJ-202, which is able to simultaneously track and engage multiple targets at 115 km (71 mi) and 80 km (50 mi), respectively. The adoption of multifunction SJ-202 radar has eliminated the need to have multiple, single-function radars, and thus greatly improved the overall effectiveness of the HQ-2 air defence system. A target drone version is designated BA-6.
- HQ-3: Development of HQ-2 with maximum ceiling increased to 30 km (19 mi), specifically targeted for high altitude and high speed spy planes like SR-71. Maximum range is 42 km (26 mi) and launching weight is around 1 ton, and maximum speed is Mach 3.5 (2,600 mph). A total of 150 built before the program ended and the subsequent withdraw of HQ-3 from active service, and the knowledge gained from HQ-3 was used to develop later version of HQ-2.
- HQ-4: Further development of HQ-2 from HQ-3, with solid rocket engines, resulting in a two-thirds reduction of logistic vehicles needed for a typical SAM battalion with six launchers: from the original more than 60 vehicles for HQ-1/2/3 to just slightly over 20 vehicles for HQ-4. After 33 missiles were built (5 from batch 01, 16 from batch 02, and 12 from batch 03), the program was cancelled, but most of the technologies were continued as separate independent research programs, and these technologies were later used on later Chinese SAMs upgrades and developments such as HQ-2 and HQ-9.
- Sayyad-1: Iranian upgraded version of HQ-2 SAM differ with the Chinese versions in guidance and control subsystems. Sayyad-1 equipped with an about 200 kg (440 lb) warhead and has speed of 1,200 m/s (2,700 mph).

==== DF-7 ====
- DF-7/Dongfeng 7/M-7/Project 8610/CSS-8: Chinese surface-to-surface tactical ballistic missile converted from HQ-1/2/3/4. M-7 missile is the only Chinese ballistic missile that can be launched at a slant angle. It carries a 500 kg (1,100 lb) warhead and have a maximum range of 180 km (110 mi). In 1989, Iran reportedly purchased 200 M-7 missiles with TELs, and officially put them into service as the Tondar-69.

==== Qaher-1 ====
- The Qaher-1 (Arabic: قاهر-1, meaning "Subduer-1") is originally a Soviet S-75 missile that was developed locally by the Houthis to be a surface to surface missile that works on two stages, liquid fuel and solid fuel. It was unveiled in December 2015. The Houthis have fired many Qaher-1s into Saudi Arabia during the course of the Yemeni Civil War.

== Operators ==
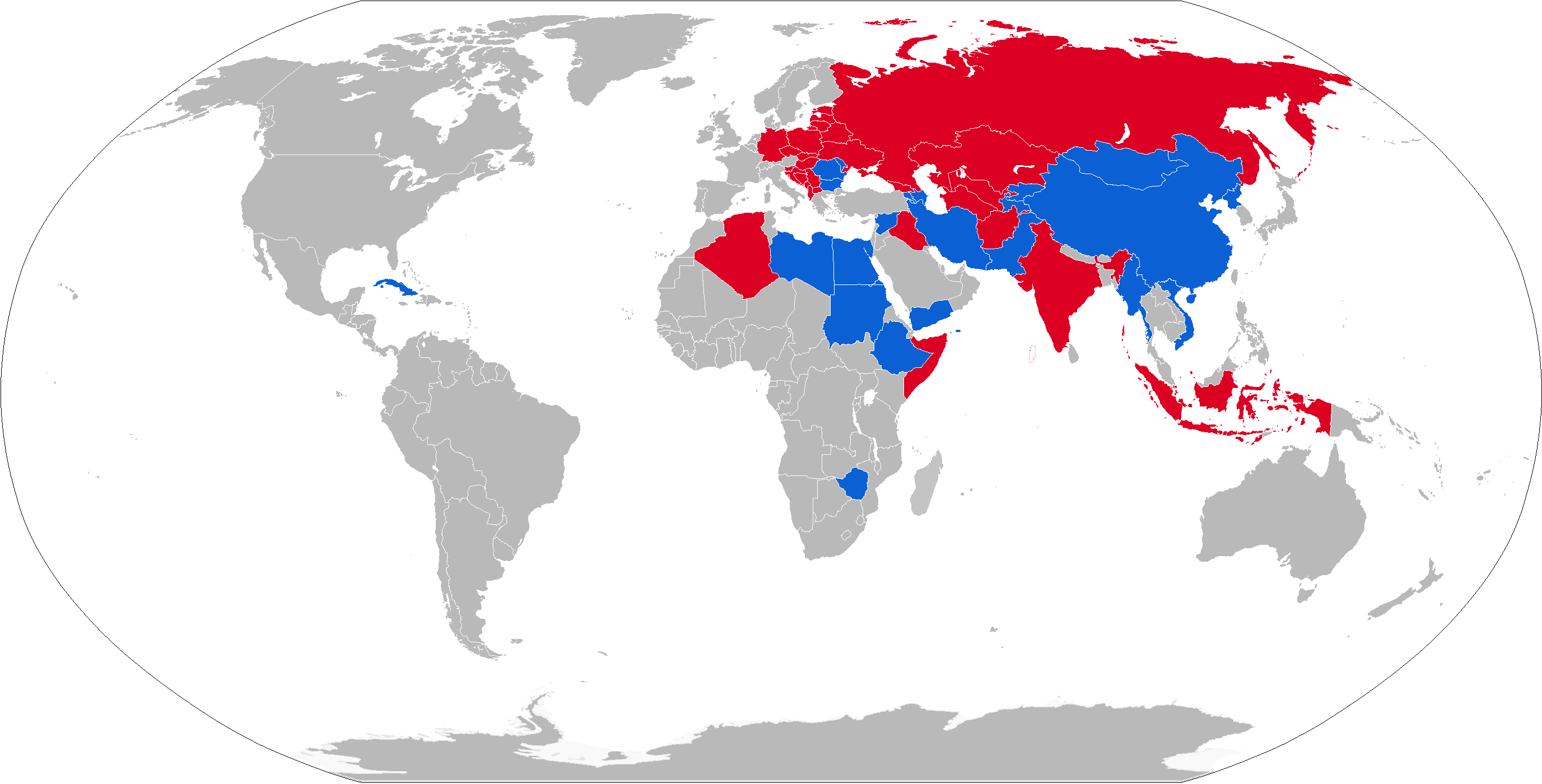
Operators Current Former

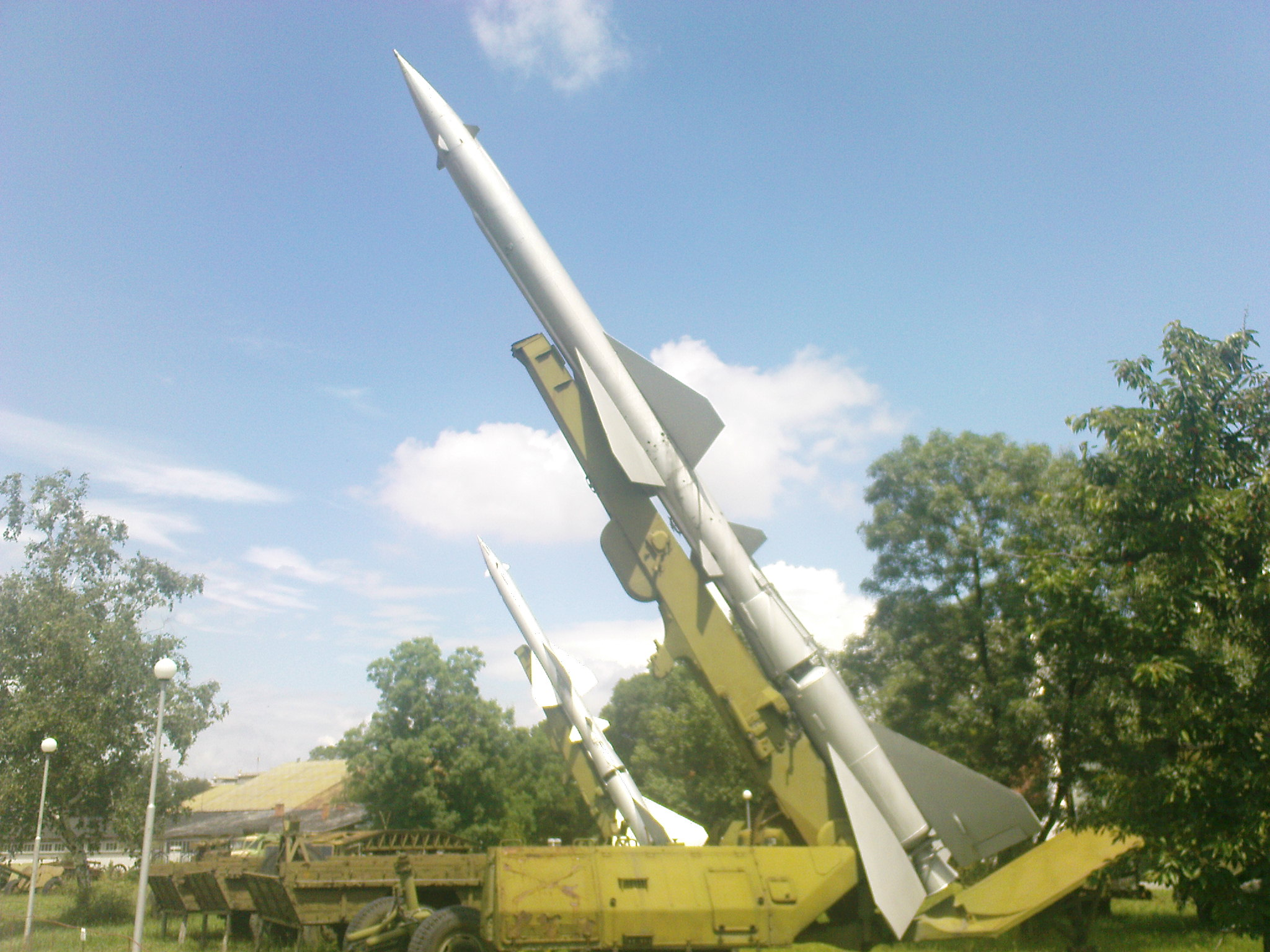
A pair of S-75 launchers

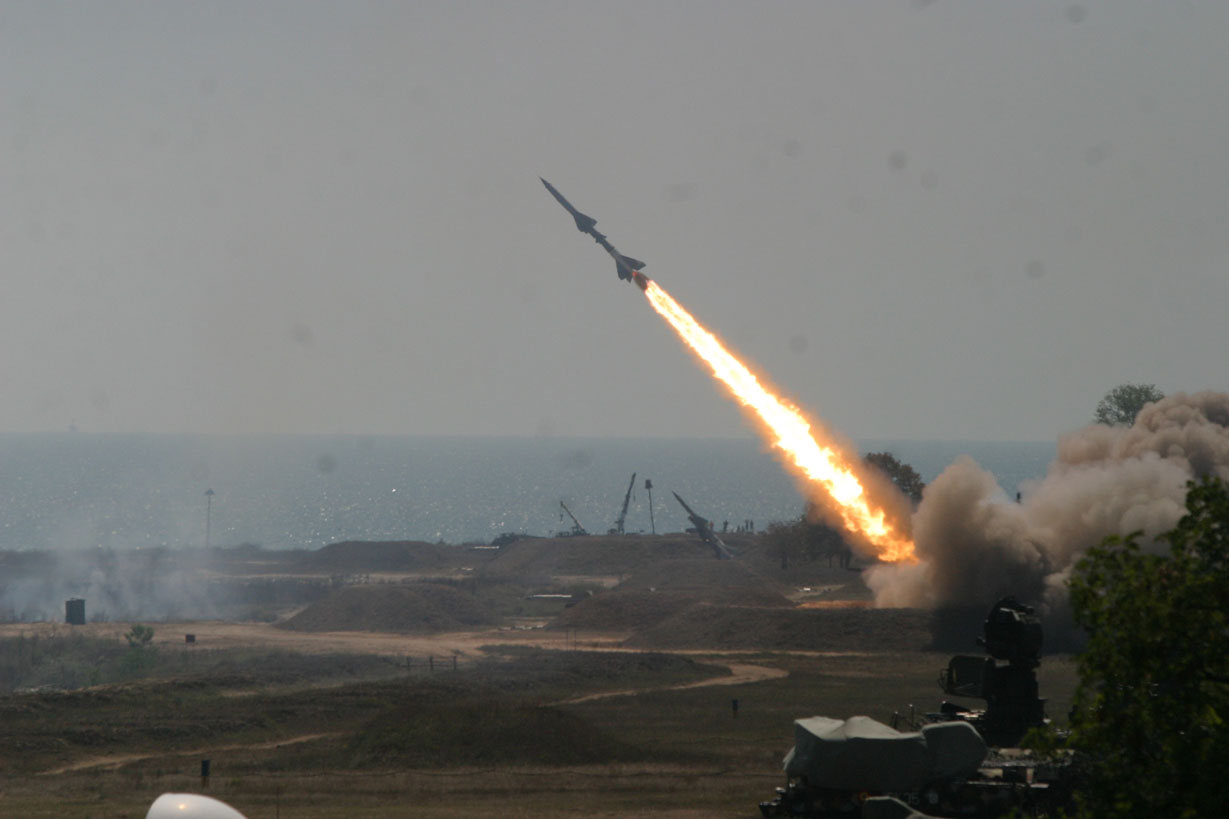
Romanian S-75M3 "Volhov" launching a 5Ia23 missile at Capu Midia firing range.

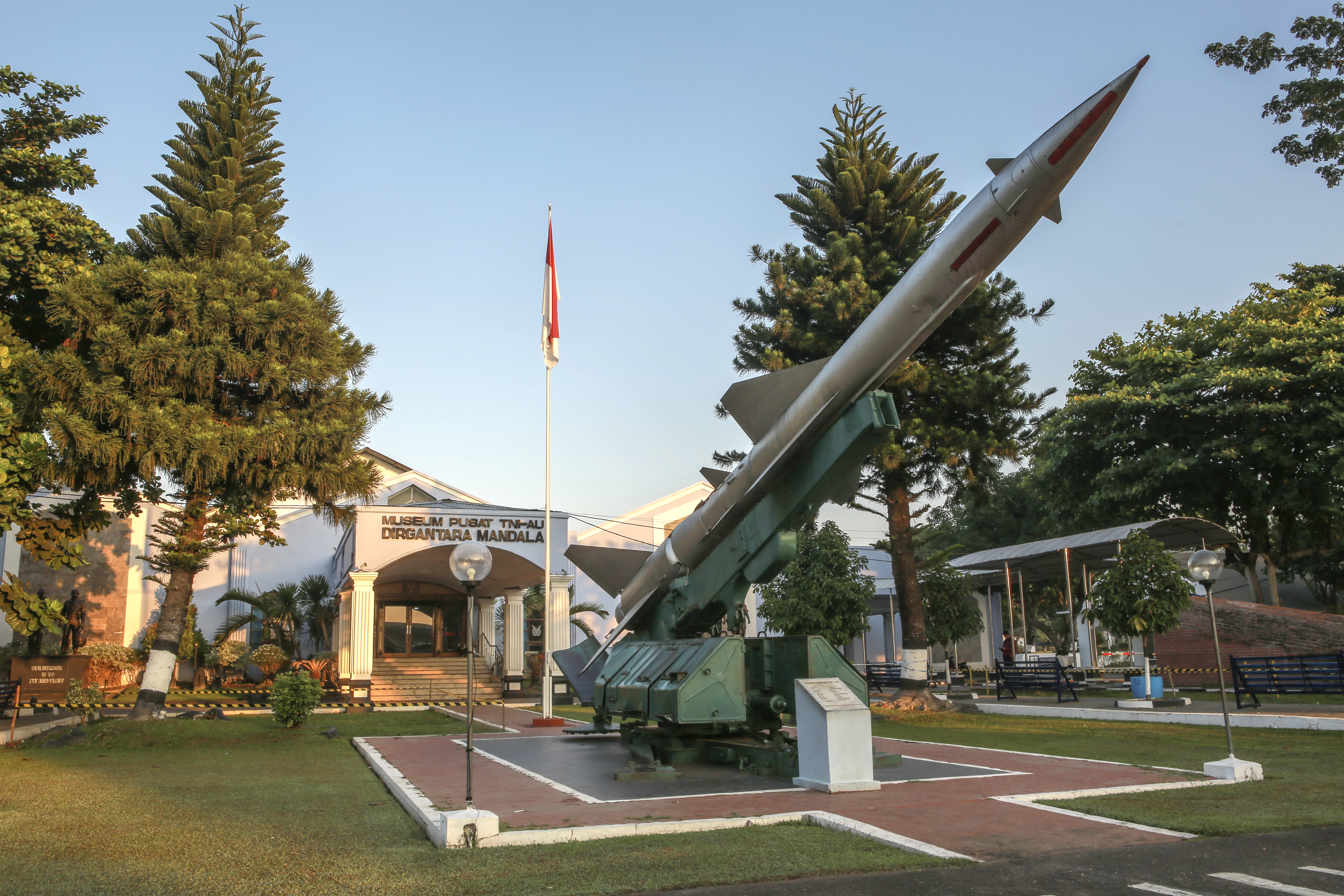
Indonesian S-75 Dvina (SA-2) Surface-to-air missile system at Dirgantara Mandala Museum

=== Current ===
- Angola - 40
- Armenia – 79 Launchers
- Azerbaijan – 25
- Cuba - Some mounted on T-55 tank chassis
- Egypt – ~210 S-75M Volkhov
- Ethiopia – Some developed into self-propelled systems
- Iran – 9 HQ-2
- Kazakhstan - 12 S-75M Volkhov
- Kyrgyzstan – 6 S-75M3 Dvina
- Myanmar – 48 next 250 in 2008
- North Korea – 179+
- Syria – 36+
- Vietnam – ~25
- Yemen

=== Former ===
- Afghanistan − 18 launchers in 1992
- Albania − 24 launchers in 1992 including HQ-1 and HQ-2 systems
- Angola − 18 launchers in 2002
- Belarus
- Bosnia and Herzegovina − Used by the Army of Republika Srpska
- Bulgaria
- China − Mostly HQ-2 systems
- Czechoslovakia − 120 launchers in 1992. Passed on to successor states
- Czech Republic
- East Germany
- Georgia
- Hungary − 96 launchers in 2002
- India − 150 launchers in 1992
- Indonesia – under Paskhas, Indonesian Air Force and Indonesian National Air Defense Forces Command, retired in 1980
- Iraq − 120 launchers in 1989
- Islamic State − Captured some S-75 missiles from the Syrian Army in 2014, but no launchers
- Libya − 108 launchers in 2002
- Mongolia − 6 launchers in 1992
- Mozambique
- North Vietnam
- North Yemen
- Pakistan – HQ-2B retired from service in 2020 from the Pakistan Air Force.
- Poland − 240 launchers in 2002
- Romania - 5 S-75M3 Volkhov
- Russia − 150 launchers in 2002
- Serbia and Montenegro − 24 launchers in 2002
- Slovakia
- Somalia − 42 launchers in 1991
- Sudan − 18 S-75M launchers, non-operational
- South Yemen
- Soviet Union − 2,400 launchers in 1991, passed on to successor states
- Tajikistan
- Tigray People's Liberation Front
- Ukraine
- Uzbekistan
- Yugoslavia − 48 launchers in 1992, passed on to successor states

== See also ==
- Project Nike - similar US medium-high altitude anti-air missile system
- Bristol Bloodhound - the UK equivalent
