= Laus (radar) =

Laus (English: louse) was the name for a series of German ECCM equipment during World War II. They were additions to German radar equipment in order to counteract the Allied use of 'Window' (German: Düppel), a chaff radar countermeasure.

== Window ==
Window, was an early chaff countermeasure to radar. Huge quantities of conductive strips, made of foil or metallised paper, were cut to the dipole length (Note: Half of a wavelength. For Würzburg, λ=54cm, this was 27cm) of the radar to be defeated and dropped from aircraft. The dipoles reflect enough to appear as a large diffuse target. Although the real target aircraft continue to reflect and are shown by the radar, they cannot be distinguished from the decoy cloud.

German Würzburg radar was susceptible to Window attack. The short wavelength allowed the use of short strips which fell only slowly, giving the cloud a long dispersion time. Würzburg also used conical scanning, which gives a slowly rotating polarisation, so that it was affected by all of the strips, no matter their orientation.

=== Countermeasures ===
Chaff was invented independently by Britain, Germany and Japan, but was not used early on, owing to mutual fears that it would be turned against the inventor. It was not used until 24–25 July 1943 and the Operation Gomorrah raids against Hamburg. Despite having been known in Germany since 1940, no countermeasures had yet been developed against it.

Chaff is relatively stationary in the air, falling slowly and moving with any wind. This contrast with the speed of the target aircraft was the key to most of the anti-Window measures. Radar reflections are affected by the Doppler effect: reflections from a radially moving target are shifted in frequency; shorter wavelengths on the approach, longer when departing.

== Variants ==
=== Freya-laus ===
For the Freya radar, using Doppler.

=== Wurzlaus ===
(Wurzburg Louse)

Equipment added to all Wurzburg radars between July and August 1943.

=== K-Laus ===
Considered to be the best of the countermeasures to Window.

It operated by using the Doppler shift of the returned signal. Reflections from a moving aircraft would be shifted in frequency, those from slowly drifting chaff would not. A band-pass filter was added so that only signals with an offset of 200 to 700 Hz from the transmitted frequency would be accepted. By January 1945, 1,000 sets had been ordered and somewhere between 40 and 50 were in use.

=== Reise-Gustav ===
Anti-Window equipment installed in Wurzburg-Reise radar sets.

=== Reisslaus ===
(Running Louse)

Phase modulation of the Wurzburg's transmitted signal from pulse to pulse. Reflections from the Window chaff would thus be out of phase.

Still in development at the end of the war.

=== Schiebelaus ===
(Shovel Louse)

Still only at the development stage by the end of the war.

=== Tastlaus ===
(Keyboard Louse)

Introduced in November 1944 and replacing Wurzlaus. May have been a counter to electronic jamming, rather than chaff.
