= AN/ALQ-126 =

Military aircraft electronic countermeasures system

- Electronic countermeasures system
- Status: In Service

Manufacturing Info
- Manufacturer(s): Sanders Associates, BAE
- Introduced: 1969 (56 years ago)
- Production period: 1969–1991 (22 years)
- Developed from: AN/ALQ-100

Specifications
- Frequency Range: 2–18 GHz (15.0–1.7 cm)
- Height: 16.2 in (41 cm)
- Width: 10.6 in (27 cm)
- Length: 24 in (61 cm)
- Weight: 190 lb (86 kg)

Usage
- Used by military: Royal Australian Air Force; Royal Canadian Air Force; Royal Danish Air Force; Kuwait Air Force; Royal Malaysian Air Force; Spanish Air and Space Force; United States Navy; United States Marine Corps
- Platform(s): See Platforms
- Variants: AN/ALQ-126A; AN/ALQ-126B

AN/ALQ-126 is a multimode power managed reprogrammable defensive electronic countermeasures (DECM) system for military aircraft. It may be either externally mounted in a pod or internally mounted within the host aircraft. It was originally developed by Sanders Associates for use by the US Navy and Marine Corps to be employed on F/A-18 Hornet aircraft and its variants. Due to mergers and acquisitions over the years, the system was eventually produced by Sanders, A Lockheed Company until 1991, and is now supported by BAE Systems.

In accordance with the Joint Electronics Type Designation System (JETDS), the "AN/ALQ-126" designation represents the 126th design of an Army-Navy electronic device for an airborne countermeasures special/combination system. The JETDS system is now used to also name all Department of Defense and some NATO electronics systems.

== Functional Overview ==
Interfaced with the aircraft's radar warning receiver (RWR), the ALQ-126 is capable of receiving and processing radio frequency (RF) signals in the 2–18 GHz (15.0–1.7 cm) range. Once processed, it selects the most effective countermeasures technique, and transmits that jamming signal at up to 1 kW per channel to disrupt threats. The system has various jamming techniques at its disposal including inverse conical scanning (ICS), range gate pull-off (RGPO), velocity gate pull-off (VGPO), swept square wave (SSW). and main lobe blanking (MLB).

== Development ==
Produced by Sanders as part of the US Navy's Charger Blue program in 1969, development of the system evolved from the AN/ALQ-100. The ALQ-100 was considered unreliable by some aircrews. With modernized deception techniques, construction and cooling arrangements, the ALQ-126A was an improvement over the older ALQ-100, although not all aircrews agreed with that determination.

In 1975, development of an improved AN/ALQ-126B version started and was approved for service use in October 1981. The initial production contract for the ALQ-126B was awarded the following August, but production was delayed until September 1983. In all, the system was produced for the US Navy from 1969 until Sanders' last delivery 26 November 1991. In the course of production, the ALQ-126 saw Foreign Military Sales (FMS) to several countries including Australia, Canada, Denmark, Kuwait, Malaysia and Spain for use on variants of F-16 Fighting Falcon, F/A-18 Hornet, and F-35 Lightning II aircraft. A pod-mounted version of the ALQ-126 was developed for the AV-8B Harrier II as well, packaged in the pod with the AN/ALQ-162 continuous wave (CW) jamming system, together designated as the AN/ALQ-164(V).

In a press release on 24 February 2005, Naval Air Systems Command (NAVAIR) announced a new contract for BAE to service existing AN/ALQ-126B systems. BAE had acquired the Sanders group which had previously merged into Lockheed Corporation in 1986, which then in 1995 with the Lockheed and Martin Marietta merger, they were known as Lockheed Martin Aerospace Electronic Systems (AES). In 2000, Lockheed sold AES to BAE who called it BAE Systems Information & Electronic Warfare Systems (IEWS). By 2005, they were again merged along with Lockheed Martin Control Systems to become BAE Systems Electronic Systems. The 5-year Commercial Service Agreement (CSA) in February the same year was valued at US$11 million. BAE already had an existing Performance Based Logistics (PBL) contract with Naval Inventory Control Point-Philadelphia (NAVICP-P) to provide ALQ-126B systems to the fleet.

== Characteristics ==
System components include a digital instantaneous frequency measurement receiver, distributed microprocessors, and solid-state microwave amplifiers. Overall characteristics of these system components include:

- Weight: 190 pounds (86 kg)
- Dimensions: 16.2 × 10.6 × 24 inches (41 × 27 × 61 cm)
- Volume: 2.3 cu ft (0.065 m^{3})
- Frequency range: 2–18 GHz (15.0–1.7 cm)
- Transmission power: 1 kW per band
- Response time: 0.1 μsec

== Variants ==
- AN/ALQ-126 – Development model
- AN/ALQ-126A – Production version until the late 1980s
- AN/ALQ-126B – Production version until 1991
- AN/ALQ-164(V) – pod-mounted version comprising AN/ALQ-126 and AN/ALQ-162

== Platforms ==
The ALQ-126 has been used on the following aircraft types:

- A-4 Skyhawk
- A-6 Intruder
- A-7 Corsair II
- AV-8B Harrier II
- EA-6B Prowler
- F-4 Phantom II
- F-8 Crusader
- F-14 Tomcat
- F/A-18C/D Hornet
- F/A-18E/F Super Hornet
- RF-4B Phantom II

== See also ==
- Similar airborne electronic countermeasures systems
- List of military electronics of the United States
