= SNR-75 =

Soviet military radars

SNR-75 radar
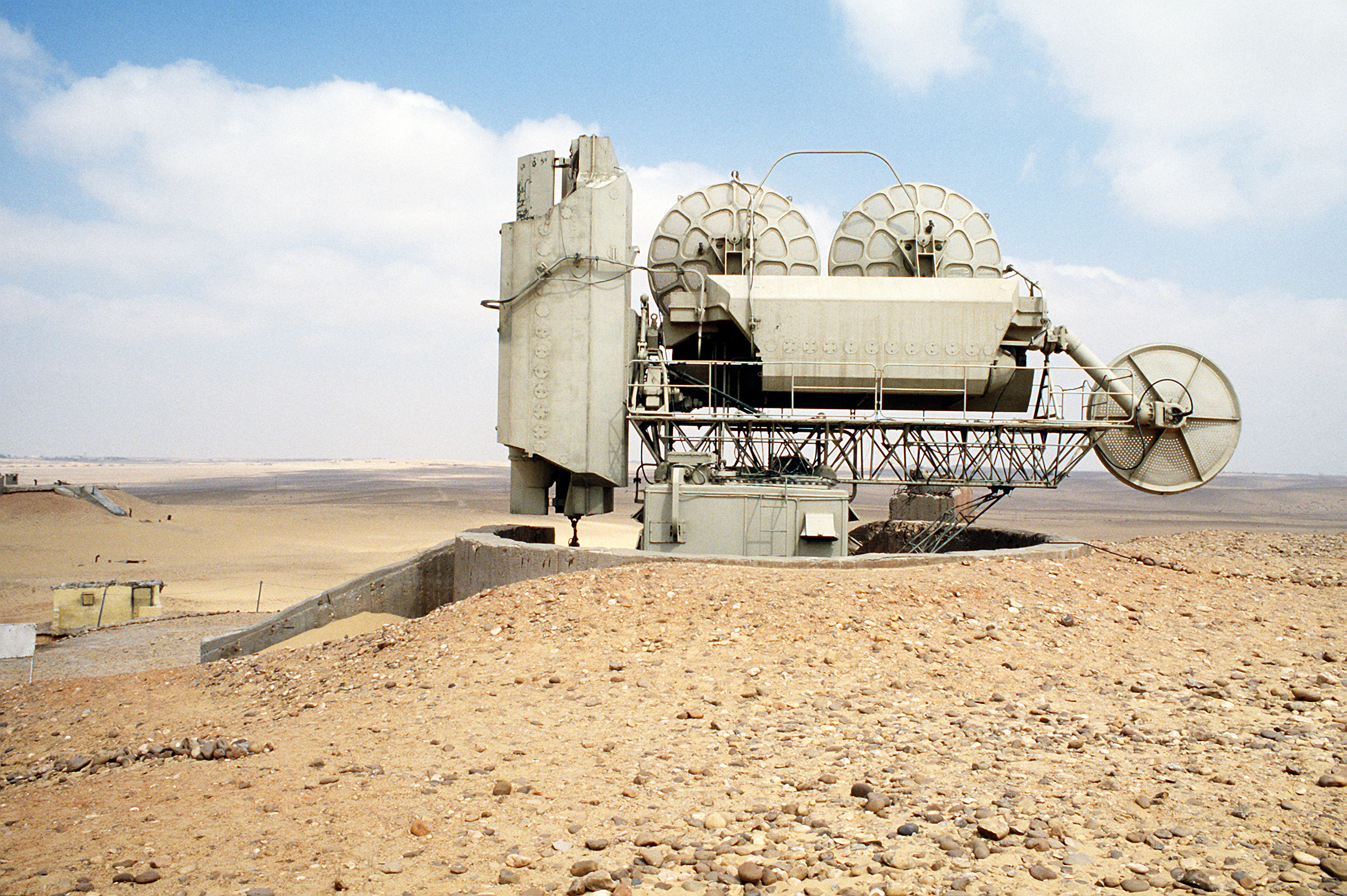
- Egyptian Fan Song E
- Country of origin: Soviet Union
- Type: Fire control & tracking
- Frequency: E/F band, G band
- PRF: search: 828-1,440 Hz; track: 1,656-2,880 Hz (G band)
- Beamwidth: 10x2deg (E/F band); 7.5x1.5deg (G band)
- Pulsewidth: 0.4-1.2 μs (G band)
- Range: 60-120 km (E/F band); 75-145 km (G band)
- Power: 600 kW (E/F band); 1.0 MW (G band)

The SNR-75 (also referred to by the NATO reporting name Fan Song) is a series of trailer-mounted E band/F band and G band fire control and tracking radars for use with the Soviet SA-2 Guideline surface-to-air missile system.

== Description ==
The Fan Song radars are capable of tracking 6 targets at a time, and can guide up to three missiles at once to it. The radars feature two orthogonal antennas, one for azimuth and one for elevation, which can operate in a track-while-scan mode. These antennas transmit 10 × 2 degree or 7.5 x 1.5 degree beams and perform a 'flapping' motion as they scan their sectors.

The Fan Song E includes two additional parabolic dishes for narrow beam and LORO tracking modes.

== See also ==
- List of NATO reporting names for equipment
- List of radars
