= Würzburg radar =

German WWII ground-based tracking radar

Würzburg-Riese (Giant Würzburg) radar
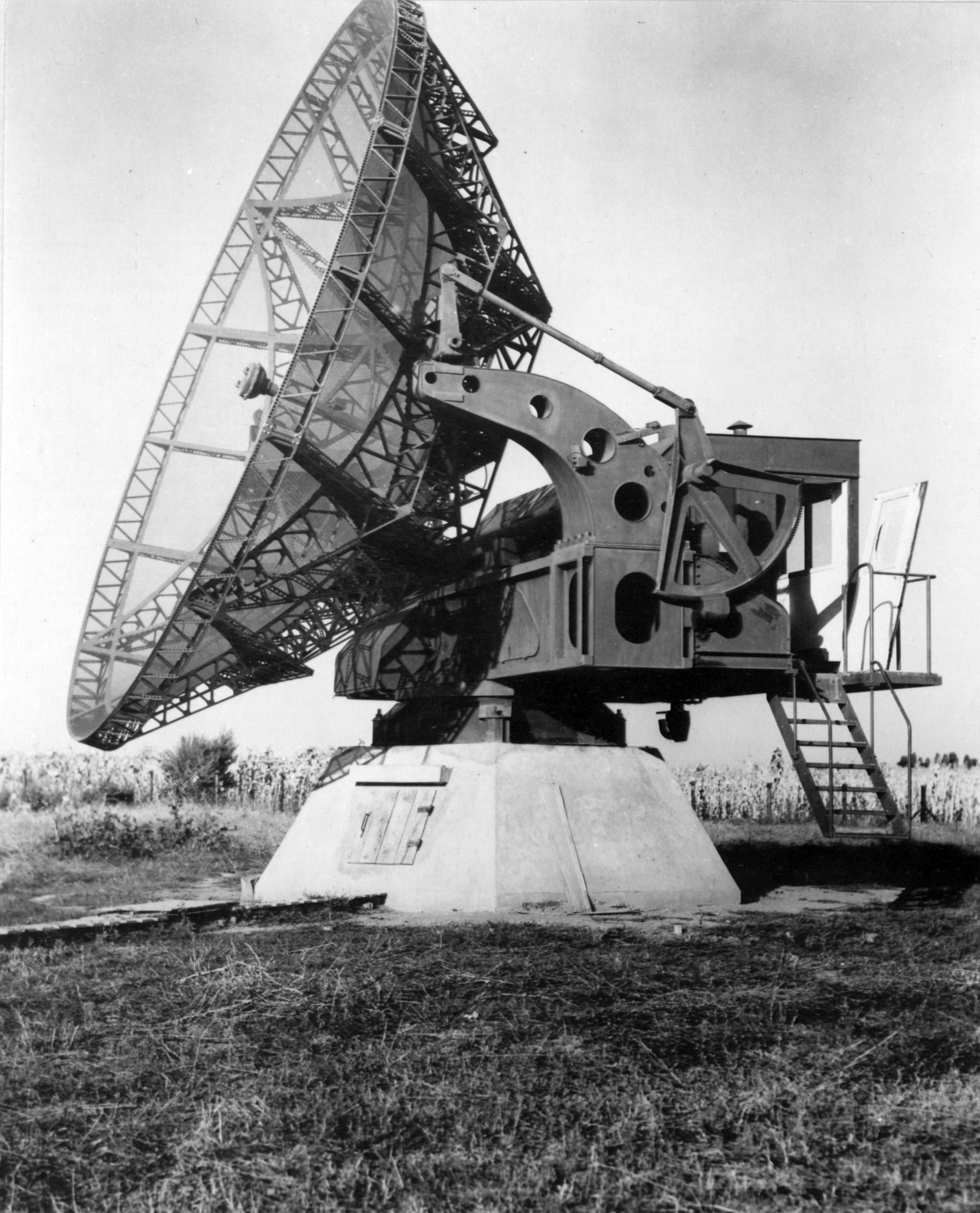
- Würzburg-Riese at Military History Museum, Gatow Airport, Berlin
- Country of origin: Germany
- Introduced: 1940
- No. built: c. 1,500
- Type: Tracking radar
- Frequency: 560 MHz
- PRF: 1875 per second
- Pulsewidth: 2 μs
- Range: up to 70 km (43 mi)
- Diameter: 7.5 metres (25 ft)
- Azimuth: 0–360°
- Elevation: 0–90°
- Precision: ±15 metres (49 ft)
- Power: 8 kW

The low-UHF band Würzburg radar was the primary ground-based tracking radar for the Wehrmacht's Luftwaffe and Kriegsmarine (German Navy) during World War II. Initial development took place before the war and the apparatus entered service in 1940. Eventually, over 4,000 Würzburgs of various models were produced. It took its name from the city of Würzburg in Bavaria.

There were two important models of the system. The first Würzburg was a transportable model that could be folded for transit and then brought into operation quickly after emplacement and levelling. The A models began entering service in May 1940 and saw several updated versions over the next year to improve accuracy, notably the addition of conical scanning in the D model of 1941. The larger Würzburg-Riese (giant) was based on the D model but used a much larger parabolic reflector to further improve resolution at the cost of no longer being mobile.

As one of Germany's primary radars, the British spent considerable effort countering it. This culminated in February 1942 with Operation Biting, in which components of an operational A model were captured. Using information from these components, the Royal Air Force introduced "Window" (chaff) and a series of white noise radar jammers known as "Carpet" to interfere with their operation. Late in the war, the British introduced the first jammers using the more advanced angle deception jamming.

== Development ==
In 1933, Wilhelm Runge, Telefunken's laboratory director, met with Rudolf Kühnhold, the leader of the Kriegsmarine Navy Transmissions Laboratory, who explained his idea of using radio waves for locating targets. Runge was unimpressed and dismissed the idea as utopian. Kühnhold then formed Gesellschaft für Elektroakustische und Mechanische Apparate (GEMA) with the owners of Tonographie, developing the Freya and Seetakt systems.

By the spring of 1935, GEMA's successes made it clear to Runge that the idea was workable after all, so he started a crash program at Telefunken to develop radar systems. With Lorenz already making progress on early warning devices, Runge had the Telefunken team concentrate on a short-range gun laying system instead. Management apparently felt it to be as uninteresting as Runge had a year earlier and assigned it a low priority for development.

By the summer of 1935, Runge directed one of his 50 cm transmitters straight up, with a receiver nearby. A Junkers Ju 52 passing directly overhead generated a strong reflection. By the next summer, he incorporated pulsing and duplexing with a paraboloid reflector into a prototype known as the Darmstadt, which offered a range accuracy of 5 km (3.1 mi). In 1939, the Würzburg system included the LS180 triode, and a rotating dipole feed, called Quirl, for conical lobe switching. It became the best AA gun-laying radar for the next three to four years, when displaced by 10 cm systems.

The resulting system, known as the FuMG 62, as well as the prototype system FuMG 39T Darmstadt were demonstrated to Hitler at Rechlin in July 1939. The Telefunken team developed an accurate system based on a klystron microwave tube operating in the range of 54–53 cm (553–566 MHz)—an extremely short wavelength for the time—with a pulse length of 2 microseconds, a peak power of 7–11 kW and a pulse repetition frequency (PRF) of 3,750 Hz. It had a maximum range of about 29 km (18 mi) and was accurate to about 25 m (82 ft) in range. Würzburg used a 3 m (10 ft) paraboloid dish antenna, which could be "folded" along the horizontal midline for travel on a wheeled trailer. The system was first accepted into service in 1940 and 4,000 of this basic layout were delivered.

== Operational models ==
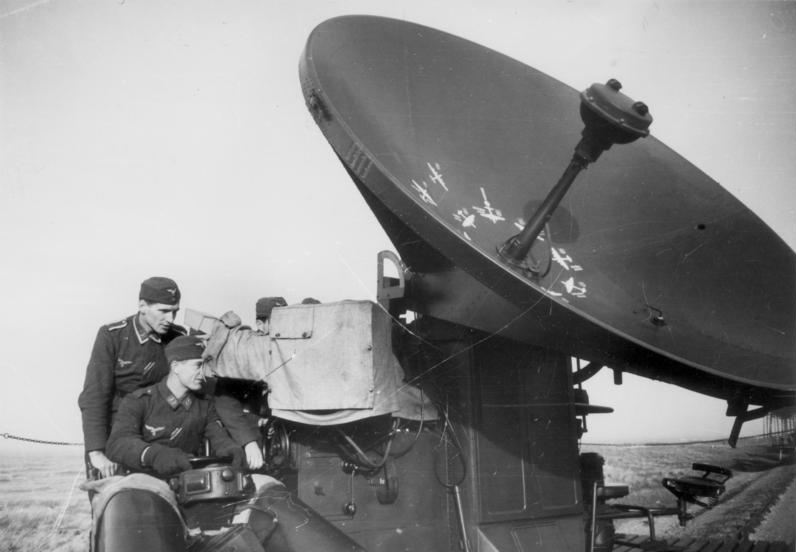
Würzburg D in use. The quirl conical scanning antenna is prominent.

Several versions of the basic Würzburg system were deployed over the course of the war. The first, Würzburg A, was operated manually and required the operators to pinpoint the target by maintaining a maximum signal on their oscilloscope display. Since the signal strength changed on its own for various reasons as well as being on or off target, this was inaccurate and generally required the use of a searchlight to spot the target once the radar had settled on an approximate position. Nevertheless, one of the first Würzburgs in service directly assisted in the shooting-down of an aircraft in May 1940 by orally relaying commands to a flak unit. An experimental Würzburg B added an infra-red detector for fine tuning, but in general these devices proved to be unusable and production was discontinued.

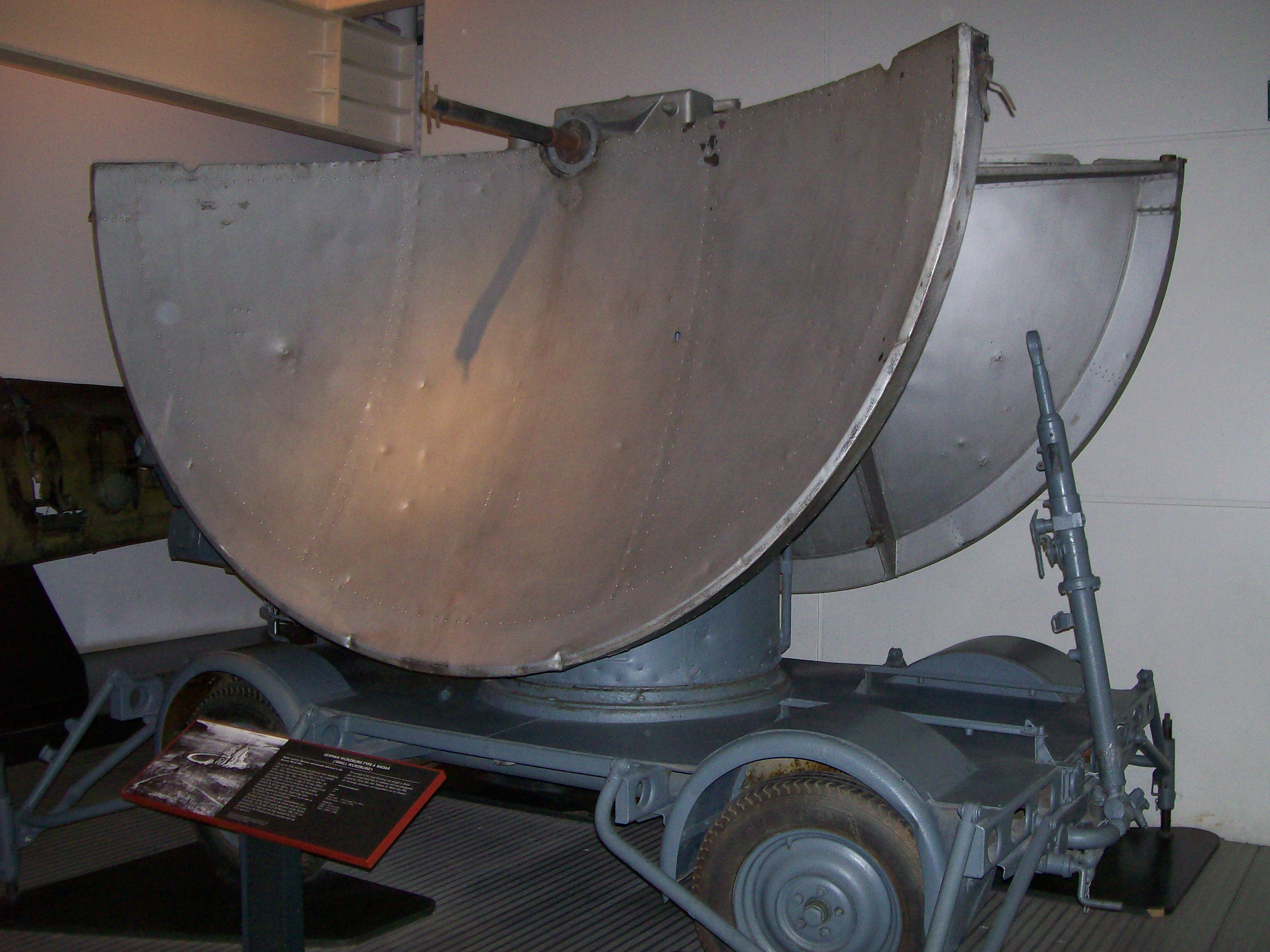
Würzburg A folded for travel. Note the simple antenna system.

Würzburg C featured lobe switching to improve aiming accuracy. It sent the signal out of one of two dipole antennas placed slightly on either side of the centreline of the parabolic reflector. The signal was switched rapidly between the two dipoles, sending the signal slightly to one side of the line of sight or the other. After slightly delaying the signal from one of the dipoles, the returns were sent to an oscilloscope display. The result appeared as two closely separated blips which the operator attempted to keep at the same height on the display by turning the antenna towards the shorter blip. This system offered much faster feedback on changes in the target position and operators could achieve accuracy on the order of a degree. Changes in signal strength, due to changes in the reflection of the target, affected both lobes equally, eliminating common-mode reading errors. An almost identical system was used in the United States's first gun-laying radar, the SCR-268.

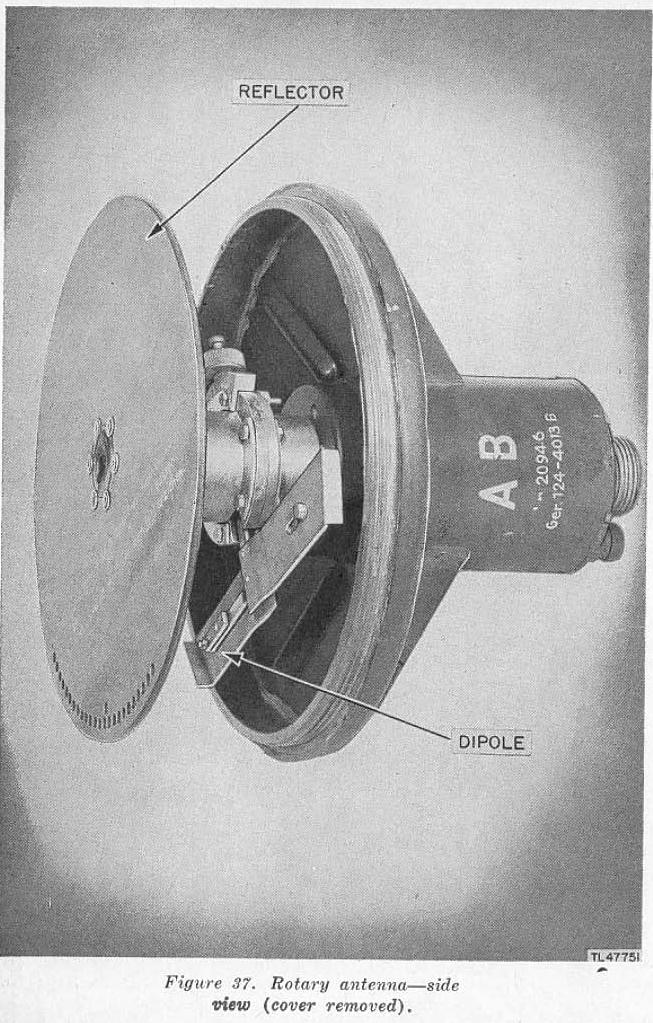
Details of the rotating quirl dipole. The flat disk on the left, the reflector, faces the target. The rotating dipole emits toward the reflector, which reflects the signal to the right. The main antenna dish would be positioned out of frame on the right, where it would focus the signal into a narrow beam facing the target.

The Würzburg D was introduced in 1941 and added a conical scanning system using an offset receiver feed called a Quirl (German for whisk) that spun at 25 Hz. The resulting signal was slightly offset from the centreline of the dish, rotating around the axis and overlapping it in the centre. If the target aircraft was centred in the line of sight the signal was steady, but if it was off-axis the strength would increase and decrease. The timing of the increases indicated the direction of the aircraft relative to the centreline. Because this variation in signal was present even when the antenna was very close to centred, the angular resolution was smaller than the beamwidth of the antenna, providing greatly improved accuracy, on the order of 0.2 degrees in azimuth and 0.3 degrees in elevation. Earlier examples were generally upgraded to the D model in the field.

Even the D model was not accurate enough for direct laying of guns. In order to provide the system with much greater accuracy, the FuMG 65 Würzburg-Riese (known as the "Giant Würzburg") was developed. Based on the same receiver circuitry and displays as the D model, the new version featured a much larger 7.4 m (24 ft) antenna and a more powerful transmitter giving a range of up to 70 km (43 mi). Azimuth and elevation accuracy was 0.1–0.2 degrees, which was enough for direct gun-laying. The system was too large to be carried on a truck trailer and was adapted for operation from a railway carriage as the Würzburg-Riese-E, of which 1,500 were produced during the war. The Würzburg-Riese Gigant was a very large version with a 160 kW transmitter, which never entered production.

== Countermeasures ==
As the radar was one of the most common in German use, the British spent considerable effort countering the system during the war. In February 1942, a Würzburg-A system at Bruneval on the coast of France was captured by British paratroopers in Operation Biting. Several key components were returned to the UK, which allowed the operational parameters of the system to be accurately determined. This led to the modification of existing transmitter systems to produce the "Carpet" system that broadcast noise on the frequencies used by particular Würzburg systems. Several updated versions of Carpet were introduced; Carpet II was the primary UK version while Carpet III was its US-built counterpart.

Operation Bellicose bombed the suspected Würzburg radar factory. The Operation Hydra bombing of Peenemünde did not affect the nearby Giant Würzburg at the Lubmin guidance and control station used for the V-2 rocket.

== Post-war use in astronomy ==
Dutch scientists brought several of the surplus German coastal Würzburg radars to the Radio Transmitting Station in Kootwijk, Netherlands in the early 1950s. There, they were used in experiments important in the development of early radio astronomy, specifically the discovery of the hydrogen line and subsequent mapping of the spiral arms of our Milky Way Galaxy.

German radar equipment including two Würzburg antennas (obtained from RAE Farnborough) was used by Martin Ryle and Derek Vonberg at the Cavendish Laboratory from 1945 to observe sunspots.

Two FuSE 65 Würzburg radars were installed around 1956 at the Ondřejov Observatory in Czechoslovakia. The first radar served until 1994 to measure solar radiation flux, and later was moved to the Military museum Lešany. The second radar was used to measure solar spectrum in range 100-1000 MHz. Later it was used only for occasional experiments.

== See also ==
- List of World War II electronic warfare equipment
- German night fighter direction vessel Togo
