= Angle deception jamming =

Electronic warfare technique

Angle deception jamming is an electronic warfare technique used against conical scanning radar systems. It generates a false signal that fools the radar into believing the target is to one side of the boresight, causing the radar to "walk away" from the target and break its radar lock-on. It is also known as angle walk-off, angle stealing, or inverse con-scan.

Angle stealing was one of the earliest jamming techniques to be used operationally, with systems employed against the German Würzburg radars near the end of World War II. The technique is not useful against monopulse radars, and is one of the main reasons those radars became popular in the post-war era.

Angle stealing belongs to the wider class of "deceptive jamming" techniques, which attempt to deceive radars based on knowledge of their operating procedures, rather than simply trying to blind them with noise. Another popular deception technique that was used against early radars is range gate pull-off.

== Description ==
=== Conical scanning ===
A typical radar produces a beam that is several degrees wide. The pattern is non-linear; the antenna is most sensitive at the center of the beam, also known as the boresight or centroid, and its sensitivity drops off at greater angles. This pattern is typically represented by measuring the angle where it has one-half the sensitivity as it does on the boresight. This is known as the half power point.

This means that a target in a radar beam will return a signal when the antenna is anywhere within a few degrees of the boresight. The pattern is too wide to allow the radar to directly guide weapons, especially anti-aircraft artillery which need accuracy on the order of 0.1 degrees. However, it is possible to use the non-linear pattern to improve the angle measurement using a system known as conical scanning.

The basic idea of conical scanning is to offset the antenna slightly to one side of the boresight and in front of a parabolic reflector. This causes the beam to be deflected slightly to the opposite side of the boresight. The antenna is then spun so that it rotates (or nutates) around the boresight axis (pointing in the direction of the target). As it rotates, the beam traces out a cone, with its tip at the antenna and its long axis aligned with the boresight. A target that is centred in the boresight will always return some signal to the radar, creating a strong, constant signal. If it is located to one side, the signal will rise and fall as the most sensitive region of the pattern rotates across it.

To use this for automatic tracking, or radar lock-on, a simple circuit is added. First, the signal is sent into a smoother that extracts the amplitude modulated signal of the series of radar pulses that were returned as it swept across the target. This will produce a flat line if the target is centred, or some form of sine wave otherwise. This is then mixed with a second control signal that has a fixed relationship to the spinning of the antenna. For instance, in the case of the Würzburg the antenna spun at 25 Hz, so this fixed signal was also 25 Hz. Sending these two signals into a phase detector produces a varying output that can be used to drive the antenna pointing motors. This output is known as the error signal, and drops to zero when the antenna is pointing directly at the target.

=== Angle stealing ===
Animation of the basic concept of angle deception. The target aircraft sends out additional signals (red bolts) increasingly delayed in time so it appears to move to a new angle far from its actual position.

An angle stealer is a transponder tuned to the radar's operational frequency that also has some knowledge about the timing of the target radar's scanning rate. The rate can be determined by examining the signal as it is received, or by being pre-set based on some basic knowledge of the radar system.

The idea is to add additional signal from the transponder to the signal naturally reflected off the target, such that the addition of those two signals no longer produces the proper output from the smoother. The radar's electronics interpret this as the antenna being misaligned, and it begins to move away from the target. Over time, this can cause the radar to "walk off" the target entirely.

There are two primary methods for causing this to occur:

==== Inverse gain modulation ====
Transponders are relatively simple radios that receive a signal, amplify it, and send it back out. Examples were in use for identification friend or foe from the start of World War II. However, these early models had the problem that they often over-amplified the signal, causing interference with other radars. This was addressed in the IFF Mark II with the addition of an automatic gain control system, which amplified the received signal to a pre-set level.

Inverse gain modulation, also known as inverse amplitude modulation, is a simple modification to this sort of transponder. It adds a smoother circuit like the one in the radar receiver, which creates an amplitude modulated signal output. This output is then inverted and sent into the gain control. The result is an output signal that is strong when the radar signal is weak, and weak when it is strong.

Depending on the exact strength of the signals, when this mixes with the radar's own signal at the radar receiver, the result is either a nearly flat smoothed curve, or one that is the inverse of the radar's curve. The resulting error signal quickly drives the radar away from the target. A carefully matched signal that is an exact invert of the original will cause the radar to believe it is aimed at the target no matter where it is pointed.

==== Swept square wave ====
The inverse gain technique was so effective against early tracking radars that these radars began using a system known as CORSO, conical-on-receive-signal-only. CORSO typically used two antennas, a transmitter with a fixed antenna, and a conically scanning receiver. The lock-on technique works the same as in a normal conical scan radar, but the transmitted signal is constant and denies the transponder information about the scanning rate of the radar. For this reason, this concept is also known as "silent lobing".

This led to the introduction of the swept square wave (SSW) technique, also known as scan rate modulation. This is generally similar to the inverse gain method, but does not know the scanning rate. Instead, the system sends out pulses on the radar's frequency at a pulse repetition frequency that is similar to the estimated scanning rate of the radar. These pulses will only be received by the radar if the receiver is pointed roughly in the aircraft's direction. To ensure this will occur at some point, the repetition frequency is slowly increased and decreased so that at some point in this pattern it briefly synchronizes with the scan rate of the antenna.

When that occurs, the radar now receives its own signal as well as a second one that is slightly offset in time. When fed into the phase detector, the output signal will no longer be a single pulse, but two, creating an error signal. Because the signal is being swept in repetition frequency, this second part of the signal moves in relation to the radar's own signal. When the two are closely synchronized it generates large error signals that can quickly drive the antenna away from the target. However, because the rate is constantly changing, after a period the error will drop to zero again, potentially before the radar has moved completely off the target.

The system is not as effective as inverse gain, which interrupts the tracking process once every scan compared to the once-every-so-often for SSW, but it provides some protection against any conical scanning or CORSO radar.
