= Range gate pull-off =

Electronic warfare technique

Range gate pull-off (RGPO) is an electronic warfare technique used to break radar lock-on. The basic concept is to produce a pulse of radio signal similar to the one that the target radar would produce when it reflects off the aircraft. This second pulse is then increasingly delayed in time so that the radar's range gate begins to follow the false pulse instead of the real reflection, pulling it off the target.

Doppler radars may not use range gates and instead select a single target by narrowly filtering frequencies on either side of the target's initial return. Against these radars, the related velocity gate pull-off (VGPO) can be used. These send a return signal that slowly changes in frequency, rather than time, hoping the radar's velocity gate will be pulled off the target in the same general fashion.

Pull-off belongs to the wider family of "deceptive jamming" concepts that use details of the target radar to their advantage, rather than attempting to simply overpower the radar's signal. Alternate names for "pull-off" include "stealing" and "walk-off". A related technique is angle deception jamming.

== Description ==
=== Range gates and strobing ===
Even the earliest radar systems included a system to highlight a single selected target for further analysis. For instance, 1939's Gun-Laying Mark I, the British Army's first operational radar, used an on-screen cursor known as the strobe to highlight a single target. This worked by filtering out, or gating, signals that were not within the strobe's short time period, typically a few microseconds, corresponding to a range of a few hundred meters. The signal within the strobe's window was then sent to secondary displays where two operators would determine the azimuth and elevation of that single target, by keeping its blip centered in their displays. Similar systems were used by many radars by the mid-war period.

By the end of the war, many experiments were being carried out on automatic target following, or radar lock-on. In these systems, the operator would select a target using the strobe, and then circuits in the radar would automatically track the target in azimuth and elevation. This eliminated the need for the additional operators. Since the target's range would continue to change as it moved, the circuitry also attempted to keep the strobe centered in range. Some systems automated even the strobing; the AI Mark V was designed for single-seat fighter aircraft where the pilot would be too busy to adjust the strobe, and instead had a second system to sweep the strobe through a wide range and then lock onto the first signal it saw.

In the post-war era the circuitry that produced the strobe and filtered out other returns became more widely known as a range gate.

=== Range Pull-off ===
While testing a late-war radar design, the AI Mk. IX, a serious problem with the auto-follow system was found.

While this system was being developed, Bomber Command was pressing the Air Ministry to use the radar countermeasure "window", better known today as chaff. Fighter Command pointed out that the Germans could easily copy the system and use it against England, potentially re-opening The Blitz. (Note: Ironically, the Germans had already discovered window on their own, and decided not to use it against the UK because they thought they might copy it and use it against Germany.) It was suggested that the AI Mk. IX would ignore window because it decelerated rapidly after it was dropped, and would thus quickly pass out of the range gates and not be tracked. Exactly the opposite occurred in testing; the radar unerringly locked onto the window and the target disappeared from the display.

Range gate pull-off is essentially an electronic version of window. Instead of producing the secondary return by dropping a packet of foil reflectors, the second return is created by a transponder in the target aircraft. The transponder initially responds as rapidly as possible to the radar's signal, producing a second blip that overlaps the original. Over a period of time, it increasingly delays the return so that it falls "behind" the radar signal in time. The goal is to delay the signal so it counters the aircraft's motion, leaving a signal at what appears to be a (nearly) fixed location in space. If the radar was locked on to the aircraft, it will hopefully remain locked to this second pulse as the aircraft moves away from the original location. Eventually, the aircraft will fall outside the range gate and disappear, while the radar continues tracking the false signal. Thus, the false signal is said to "pull the range gate off the target".

One way to reject the signal from the RGPO jammer is to note that the transponder always takes some non-zero time to respond. This means the signal will always have some component that represents the original "skin reflection" before the transponder signal is superimposed. On a plan-position indicator, the false signal will appear as a second dot at increasing distances from the first, which the operator can then manually strobe to regain lock. Alternately, if the operator is aware there is a jammer operating, they can look for the closest signal, representing the "skin reflection", and mute down any following signals. This is easily accomplished in simple electronics, and often referred to as a "leading-edge tracker".

Such systems can be defeated by tracking the original radar signal and extracting its pulse repetition frequency (PRF). With even a basic measure of the PRF, the jammer can broadcast noise across the time frame of the skin reflection in order to obscure it. This can be particularly effective against leading-edge trackers, which will no longer have a sharp signal to gate on. Since these systems generate two signals, one to blank the leading-edge and another to perform pull-off, these are sometimes known as "dual-mode jammers".

A more complex solution requires extremely accurate tracking of the PRF. If this can be achieved, the RGPO can then broadcast its deception signal on either side of the skin reflection and walk-off in either direction. This technique easily defeats leading-edge tracking, and also makes it difficult for a manual operator to tell which of the returns is the "real" signal.

=== Velocity pull-off ===
Doppler radars directly measure the target's velocity via the Doppler effect. In typical early implementations, the received signal was amplified and then sent into a bank of narrow-band filters, each one corresponding to a particular target velocity. A simpler system is used in some semi-active radar homing missiles, which are pre-programmed with a measured target velocity which is used to calculate the expected Doppler shift of the signal, and then filter out signals outside a narrow band around that frequency.

If an RGPO jammer responds to such a signal by sending out the same frequency it received, this additional signal will be sent into the same filter, adding to the original signal and making it stronger. If the transponder instead responds at a fixed frequency, it will fall into a different filter and can be easily distinguished. In either case, the original target return remains locked-on.

Modifying a transponder to deal with Doppler radars is easy, it simply requires it to be able to adjust its frequency. In this case, the system initially responds at the same frequency as the original signal, and then increasingly shifts the frequency over time in a manner similar to the RGPO case. This will cause a second signal to appear in adjacent filters, with no way to know which is the original. Since the frequency can be easily adjusted up or down, it does not have the added complication seen in RGPOs that want to pull-off in either direction.

Pulse-Doppler radars use both pulse timing and Doppler shifting to track targets, so by varying both the frequency and return timing (through amplitude modulation), these can be pulled off as well. Such a transponder will continue to work against non-Doppler radars as well, as these generally have wide frequency response and continue to see the signal as long as its frequency shift does not become significant.

=== Countermeasures ===
The effectiveness of the pull-off can be reduced if the radar changes its pulse repetition frequency, thereby making it difficult for the transponder to continue smoothly delaying the fake signal. Frequency agility has the same effect, as the transponder cannot guess what frequency to send out the fake signals on until it hears the one from the radar.

Denying this capability means the signal from the transponder can only respond to signals after hearing them on its receiver. These signals will always represent returns from greater distances than the jammer aircraft. Pulse-to-pulse comparison techniques, like moving target indication, can be used to filter out these sorts of returns as they appear on the radar to be slower-moving targets.
