= Conical scanning =

System used in radar to improve accuracy

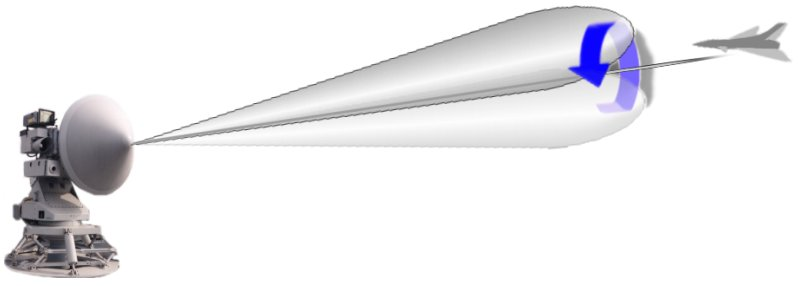
Conical scanning concept. The radar beam is rotated in a small circle around the "boresight" axis, which is pointed at the target.

Conical scanning is a system used in early radar units to improve their accuracy, as well as making it easier to steer the antenna properly to point at a target. Conical scanning is similar in concept to the earlier lobe switching concept used on some of the earliest radars, and many examples of lobe switching sets were modified in the field to conical scanning during World War II, notably the German Würzburg radar's rotating dipole antenna feed called Quirl. It was universal among gun laying radars by the end of WWII.

Conical scanning uses the non-linear nature of the radar's antennas, which are most sensitive in a single direction. By rotating the antenna, the signal returned from the target will grow stronger and weaker depending on how close it is pointed to the target. By comparing the angle of the antenna to the signal strength and looking for a peak, the angle of the target can be determined, and by examining the shape of the returned signal over time, that angle can be measured with very high precision, on the order of 10 to 100 times that of the antenna's natural beam width.

The signal returned by conical scanning can also be compared to a fixed signal using simple electronics. The difference between them represents the error signal, the angle between the target in a selected direction. By taking two such measurements, one "up" and one "right", the resulting signals can be amplified and sent into electric motors that move the antenna in that direction. This causes the antenna to automatically follow the target, dramatically simplifying the operation of the system as a whole, and often eliminating two operators that formerly provided this functionality manually. Systems with fully-automatic tracking of this sort include the American SCR-584 and late-war British aircraft interception radars.

Simple conical scanning systems are subject to angle deception jamming, which causes the error signal to be spoofed and cause the radar to "walk off" the target. This was applied near the end of the war by British systems working against the Würzburg. This led to the replacement of conical scan systems with monopulse radar sets starting in the 1950s. Conical scanning is still used where jamming is not a concern, for example, the Deep Space Network uses it for maintaining communications links to space probes. The spin-stabilized Pioneer 10 and Pioneer 11 probes used onboard conical scanning maneuvers to track Earth in its orbit.

== Concept ==
A typical radar antenna commonly has a beam width of a few degrees. While this is adequate for locating the target in an early warning role, it is not nearly accurate enough for gun laying, which demands accuracies on the order of 0.1 degrees. It is possible to improve the beam width through the use of larger antennas, but this is often impractical.

In order to monitor the direction of a designated target, it is only necessary to keep the antenna pointed directly at the target. Knowledge of the pointing direction of the antenna then gives knowledge of the target direction. In order to have the radar system follow a moving target automatically, it is necessary to have a control system that keeps the antenna beam pointing at the target as it moves. The radar receiver will get maximum returned signal strength when the target is in the beam center. If the beam is pointed directly at the target, when the target moves it will move out of the beam center and the received signal strength will drop. Circuitry designed to monitor any decrease in received signal strength can be used to control a servo motor that steers the antenna to follow the target motion. There are three difficulties with this method:

1. The radar will have no information as to which direction the target has moved, and therefore no indication as to which direction to move the antenna to follow it.
2. As the target moves away from the beam centre, the received power changes only very slowly at first. Thus the system is rather insensitive to antenna pointing errors.
3. Variations in target echo power caused by scintillation are interpreted as target motion.

== Conical scanning ==
Variation of the echo signal in a conical scanning

Conical scanning addresses this problem by moving the radar beam slightly off center from the antenna's midline, or boresight, and then rotating it. Given an example antenna that generates a beam of 2 degrees width – fairly typical – a conical scanning radar might move the beam 1.5 degrees to one side of the centerline by offsetting the feed slightly. The resulting pattern, at any one instant in time, covers the midline of the antenna for about 0.5 degrees, and 1.5 degrees to the side. By spinning the feed horn with a motor, the pattern becomes a cone centered on the midline, extending 3 degrees across.

The key concept is that a target located at the midline point will generate a constant return no matter where the lobe is currently pointed, whereas if it is to one side it will generate a strong return when the lobe is pointed in that general direction and a weak one when pointing away. Additionally, the portion covering the centerline is near the edge of the radar lobe, where sensitivity is falling off rapidly. An aircraft centered in the beam is in the area where even small motions will result in a noticeable change in return, growing much stronger along the direction the radar needs to move. The antenna control system is arranged to move the antenna in azimuth and elevation such that a constant return is obtained from the aircraft being tracked.

Whilst use of the main lobe alone might allow an operator to "hunt" for the strongest return and thus aim the antenna within a degree or so in that "maximum return" area at the center of the lobe, with conical scanning much smaller movements can be detected, and accuracies under 0.1 degree are possible.

== Construction ==
There are two ways to cause the redirection of the beam from the antenna's midline. The first is referred to as a rotated feed. As its name suggests, a feed horn is set just off the parabolic focal point which causes the energy to focus slightly off the antenna midline. The feed is then rotated around the focal point of the paraboloid to produce the conical rotation. The other system is a nutated feed. A nutated feed offsets the antenna at an angle to a fixed feed horn, and then rotates the antenna. A variation of a nutated feed makes the feed move in a small circle, rapidly and continuously changing the pointing direction of the beam. In this latter type, neither the feed nor the antenna revolves around the pointing axis of the antenna; only the pointing direction changes, tracing out a narrow cone.

The primary difference between the two basic schemes is in polarization. As the feed horn in the rotated process spins, the polarization changes with the rotation and will thus be 90 degrees off in polarization when the feed is 90 degrees off its initial axis. As the feed horn is fixed in nutated feeds, no polarization changes occur. Most early systems used a rotated feed, due to its mechanical simplicity, but later systems often used nutated feeds in order to use the polarization information.

In the U.S. Navy Mk. 25 gun fire control radar, spiral scan mode aided target acquisition. Basically conical scan (of the non-revolving nutating feed type), the size of the scan cone cyclically increased and decreased roughly twice a second. The scanned area was several degrees, in all. (Once the target was acquired, the operator switched to conical scan for tracking.)

Since the lobe is being rotated around the midline of the antenna, conical scanning is only really appropriate for antennas with a circular cross section. This was the case for the Würzburg, which operated in the microwave region. Most other forces used much longer-wavelength radars that would require paraboloid antennas of truly enormous size, and instead used a "bedspring" arrangement of many small dipole antennas arranged in front of a passive reflector. To arrange conical scanning on such a system would require all of the dipoles to be moved, an impractical solution. For this reason the US Army simply abandoned their early gun laying radar, the SCR-268. This was not particularly annoying, given that they were in the process of introducing their own microwave radar in the aftermath of the Tizard Mission introducing, among other things, the cavity magnetron, which enabled centimetric-wavelength radio signal generation orders of magnitude stronger than the then-current klystron tube. In the resulting SCR-584, the MIT Radiation Laboratory introduced automatic tracking.

Automatic guidance for the antenna, and thus any slaved guns or weapons, can be added to a conical scan radar without too much trouble. The control system has to steer the antenna such that a constant amplitude return is received from the target.

Unfortunately there are a number of factors that can dramatically change the reflected signal. For instance, changes in the target aircraft's direction can present different portions of the fuselage to the antenna, and dramatically change the amount of signal being returned. In these cases, a conical scan radar might interpret this change in strength as a change in position. For instance, if the aircraft were to suddenly "brighten" when it was off-axis to the left, the circuitry might interpret this as being off to the right if the change occurs when the lobe is aligned in that direction. This problem can be solved by using two simultaneous overlapping receiver beams leading to the monopulse radar, so-named because it always compares signal strength from a single pulse against itself, thereby eliminating problems with all but impossibly fast changes in signal strength.

=== Conical-scan receive-only (COSRO) ===
The introduction of angle deception transponders in WWII led to the introduction of the CORSO technique. In this system, two separate antennas are used, one for transmission and a separate one for reception. Only the receiver is scanning, the transmitter only needs to be pointed in the direction of the target.

It is possible to use two separate antenna systems for CORSO, both driven by the error signals from the receiver. However, it is also possible to combine them using two feedhorns in front of a single parabolic reflector, and thereby have a single unit system. In these systems, the receiver has a feedhorn structure that contains a rotating vane. This produces three outputs, the original signal which is used to measure range, and two signals that peak when the vane is either aligned or at right angles to the target, which produce the same error signals that can then be used to drive the aiming motors. Because the vane only effects the signal after reception, there is nothing to indicate to the target that they are being scanned.

=== Antenna sampling ===
RF receive signals from multiple transmit pulses are combined mathematically to create a vertical and horizontal signal. The vertical signal is created by adding RF samples when the vane/feedhorn is in the up direction and subtracting RF samples when the vane/feedhorn is in the down direction. The horizontal signal is created by adding RF samples when the vane/feedhorn is in the left direction and subtracting RF samples when the vane/feedhorn is in the right direction.

This produces a pair of angle error signals used to drive antenna positioning drive motors.

== Jamming ==
Conical scan radars can be easily jammed. If the target knows the general operating parameters of the radar, it is possible to send out a false signal timed to grow and fade in the same pattern as the radar lobe, but inverted in strength. That is, the false signal is at its strongest when the radar signal is the weakest (the lobe is on the "far side" of the antenna compared to the aircraft), and weakest when the signal is the strongest (pointed at the aircraft). When added together with the "real" signal at the radar receiver, the resulting signal is "always strong", so the control system cannot make an accurate estimate as to where in the lobe pattern the target is located.

Actually accomplishing this in hardware is not as difficult as it may sound. If one knows that the signal is rotated at 25 RPM, as it was in the Würzburg radar, the jammer is built to fade from maximum to zero at the same speed, 25 times a minute. Then all that is needed is to sync the signals up, which is accomplished by looking for the low point in the signal (which is generally easier to find) and triggering the pattern at that point. This system, known as inverse gain jamming, was used operationally by the Royal Air Force against the Würzburg radar during World War II.

It is possible to arrange a radar so the lobes are not being moved in the broadcaster, only the receiver. To do this, one adds a second antenna with the rotating lobe for reception only, a system known as COSRO, for Conical Scan on Receive Only (compare to LORO, a similar system used against lobe switching radars). Although this denied lobing frequency information to the jammer in the aircraft, it was still possible to simply send out random spikes and thereby confuse the tracking system (or operator). This technique, called SSW for Swept Square Wave, doesn't protect the aircraft with the same sort of effectiveness as inverse gain, but is better than nothing and often fairly effective.
