= Range gate =

A range gate is an electronic circuit that selects signals within a given time period; the "gate" allows signals to pass through only within the selected time. The term is mostly used in radar, where range gates are used to select certain targets for further processing. It is also used in lidar, time-of-flight cameras and similar roles.

In early military radars, range gates were used to select a single target and then pass on this information to other displays where more information could be seen. An example is the AI Mk. IX radar, where the radar operator would use a strobe, an on-screen cursor, to select a single target. A range gate would then filter out all the other targets that might be visible to the radar. The return within that gate was then automatically tracked without further operator intervention.

In weather radar, it is common to have a series of continual range gates that separate out returns at different distances and then process them to extract Doppler shift to measure wind speed. In these cases, it is common to refer to each gate as a range bin.
