= Panavia Tornado ADV =

Series of interceptor aircraft

Tornado ADV
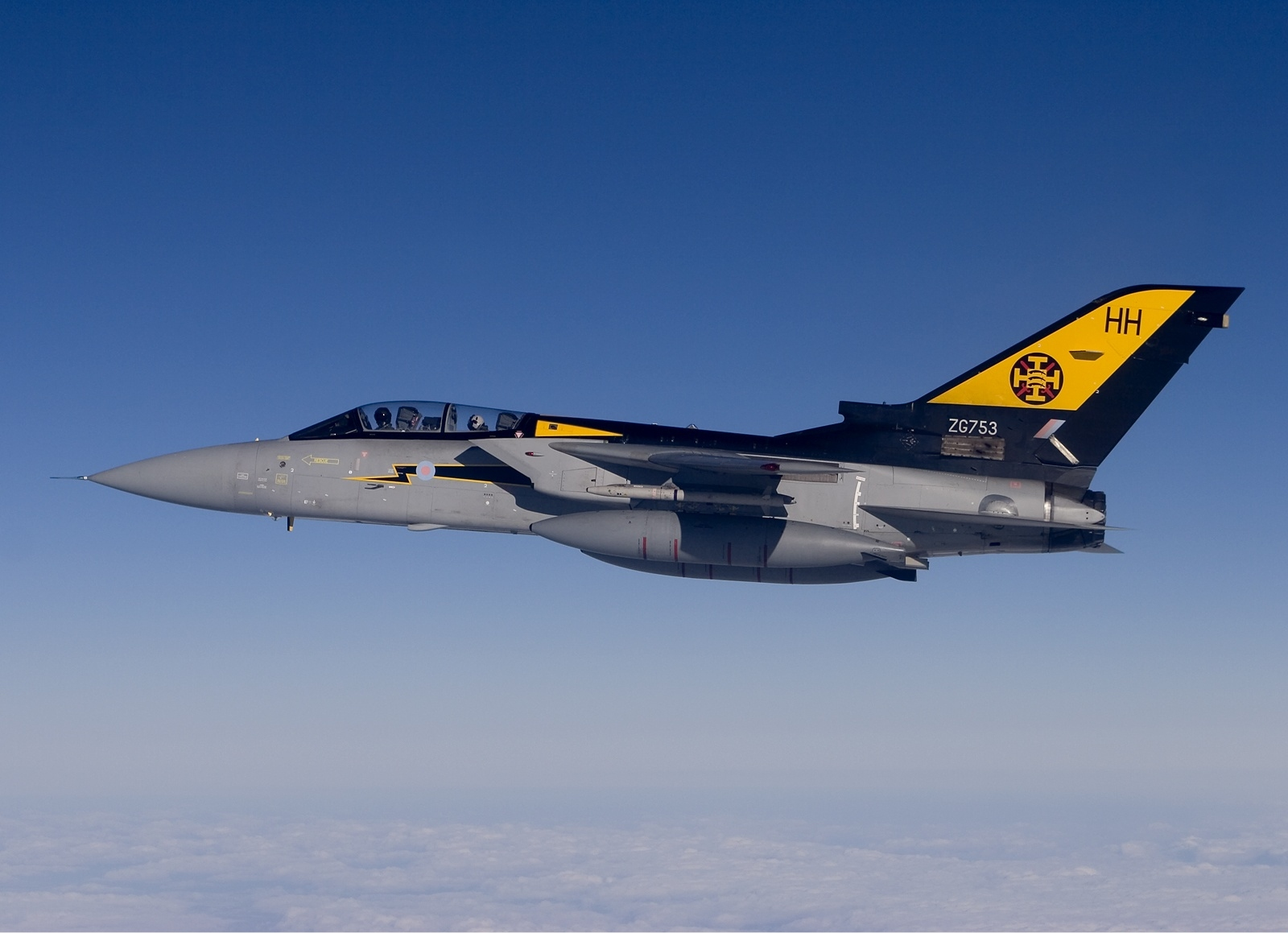
- RAF Tornado F3 of No. 111 (Fighter) Squadron

General information
- Type: Interceptor
- Manufacturer: Panavia Aircraft GmbH
- Status: Retired
- Primary users: Royal Air Force (historical) Royal Saudi Air Force (historical); Italian Air Force (historical)
- Number built: 194

History
- Introduction date: 1 May 1985
- First flight: 27 October 1979
- Developed from: Panavia Tornado IDS

The Panavia Tornado Air Defence Variant (ADV) is a long-range, twin-engine swing-wing interceptor aircraft developed by the European Panavia Aircraft GmbH consortium. It was a specialised derivative of the multirole Panavia Tornado.

Development of the Tornado ADV formally commenced in 1976. It was primarily intended to intercept Soviet bombers as they were traversing across the North Sea with the aim of preventing a successful air-launched nuclear attack against the United Kingdom. In this capacity, it was equipped with a powerful radar and beyond-visual-range missiles. Having been based on the multinational Tornado IDS, development was relatively quick. Originally, the programme was solely pursued by the United Kingdom. The first prototype performed its maiden flight on 27 October 1979; two further prototypes followed in the year after. The initial production model, the Tornado F2, entered service with the Royal Air Force (RAF) in 1986.

The Tornado F2, which was only produced in small numbers, lacked key features such as radar, due to development issues. Accordingly, it was quickly followed by the Tornado F3, which was introduced in 1989. Featuring optimised RB.199 Mk 104 engines, an expanded missile capacity, and automatic wing sweep control system amongst other improvements, the Tornado F3 became the definitive variant operated by the RAF. It was also operated by the Italian Air Force (AMI) and the Royal Saudi Air Force (RSAF). The AMI leased the type during the 2000s as an interim aircraft while awaiting delivery of multirole Eurofighter Typhoon fighters. During its service life, the Tornado ADV received several upgrades which enhanced its aerial capabilities and enabled it to perform Suppression of Enemy Air Defences (SEAD) missions in addition to its interceptor duties. Both the RAF and RSAF retired their Tornado ADV fleets in the early 2010s; the type has been replaced in both services by the Eurofighter Typhoon.

== Design and development ==
=== Background ===
The origins of the Tornado ADV can be traced back to the issuing of RAF Air Staff Requirement 395 (ASR.395), which called for a long-range interceptor to replace both the English Electric Lightning F6 and McDonnell Douglas Phantom FGR2 then in service with the Royal Air Force (RAF). The necessity to procure a modern interceptor was primarily driven by the threat posed by the sizable strategic bomber fleet then being operated by the Soviet Union, in particular the Tupolev Tu-22M, a recently introduced supersonic bomber. Even at the onset of development on what would become the Tornado IDS (interdictor/strike) in 1968, the possibility of a variant dedicated to air defence had been quietly considered. While several American aircraft had been evaluated for meeting this requirement, they were all determined to be unsuitable.

Despite Britain's strong interest in the air defence concept, it proved to be unattractive to the other European partners on the Tornado project, leading to its development being pursued solely by the United Kingdom. On 4 March 1976, the development of the Tornado ADV was approved and it was announced that 165 of the 385 Tornados that were on order for the RAF would be of the air defence variant. In 1976, the British Aircraft Corporation was contracted to provide three prototype aircraft.

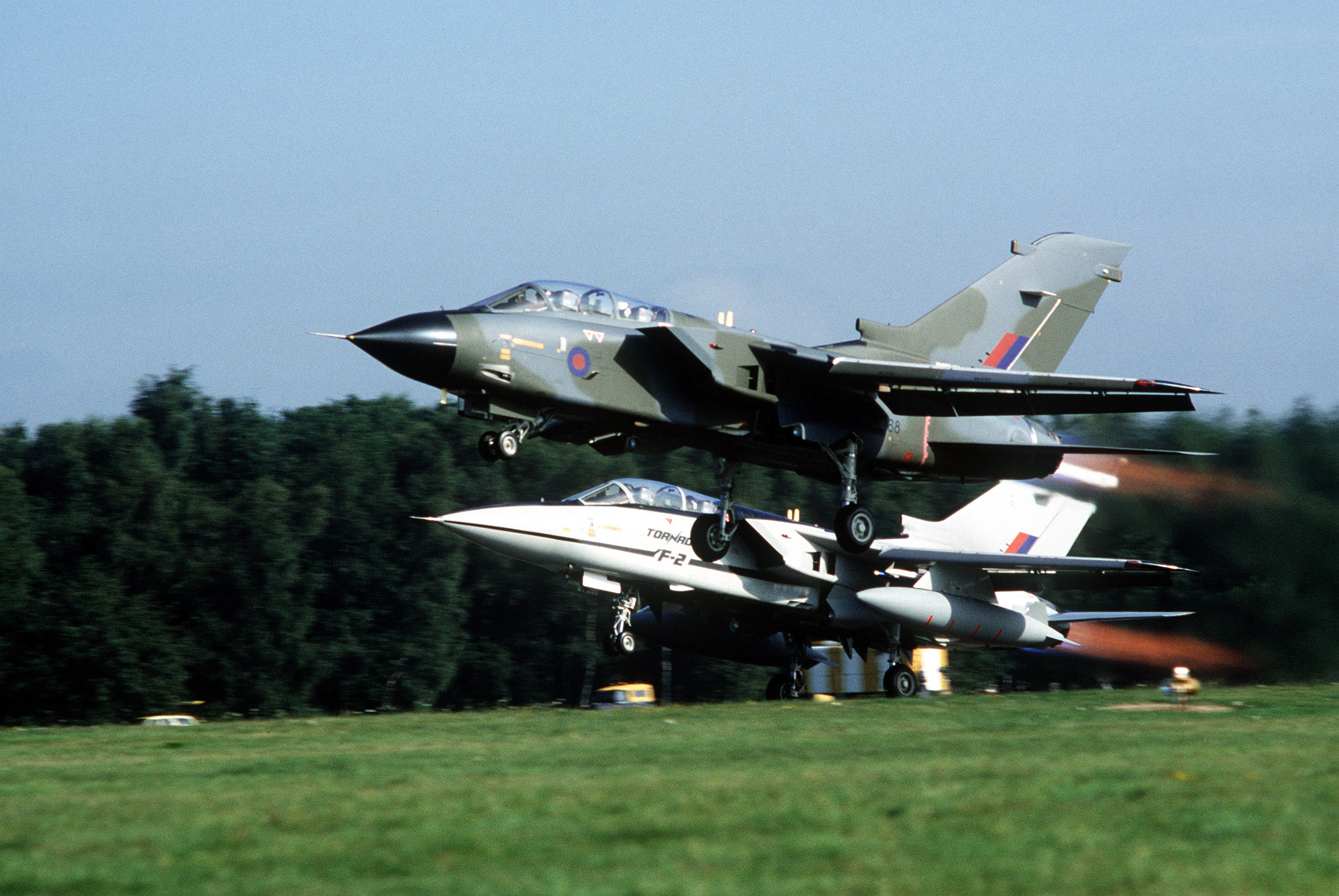
Formation take-off of an RAF Tornado GR.1 and a Tornado F.2 prototype, September 1982

On 9 August 1979, the first prototype was rolled out at Warton; it performed its maiden flight on 27 October 1979, piloted by David Eagles. The second and third development aircraft made their first flights on 18 July and 18 November 1980 respectively. The third prototype was primarily used in the testing of the new Marconi/Ferranti AI.24 Foxhunter aircraft interception radar. During flight testing, the Tornado ADV demonstrated its noticeably superior supersonic acceleration to the Tornado IDS, even while carrying a full weapons loadout. The test programme was greatly aided by the use of real-time telemetry, which broadcast live data from in-flight aircraft back to technicians on the ground.

The Tornado ADV's differences compared to the Tornado IDS include a greater sweep angle on the wing gloves, and the deletion of their Krueger flap, deletion of the port cannon, a longer radome for the Foxhunter radar, slightly longer airbrakes, and the fuselage being lengthened by 1.36 m; the latter change permitted the carriage of four Skyflash semi-active radar homing missiles. This stretch was achieved by altering the Tornado's forward fuselage, which was built in the UK, via the addition of a plug immediately behind the cockpit, which had the unexpected benefit of reducing drag and making space for an additional fuel tank (Tank '0') carrying 200 imperial gallons (909 L; 240 U.S. gal) of fuel. The artificial feel of the flight controls was lighter on the Tornado ADV than on the IDS. Various other differences were present amongst the aircraft's avionics, displays, guidance systems and software packages.

The Tornado F2 was the initial version of the Tornado ADV in RAF service, a total of 18 aircraft were built. Making its first flight on 5 March 1984, it was powered by the same RB.199 Mk 103 engines used by the IDS Tornado, capable of four wing sweep settings, and fitted to carry only two underwing Sidewinder missiles. Serious problems were discovered with the Foxhunter radar, which meant that the aircraft were delivered with concrete or lead ballast installed in the nose as an interim measure until they could be fitted with the radar sets. The ballast was nicknamed Blue Circle, which was a play on the Rainbow Codes nomenclature, and a British brand of cement called Blue Circle.

=== Tornado F3 ===
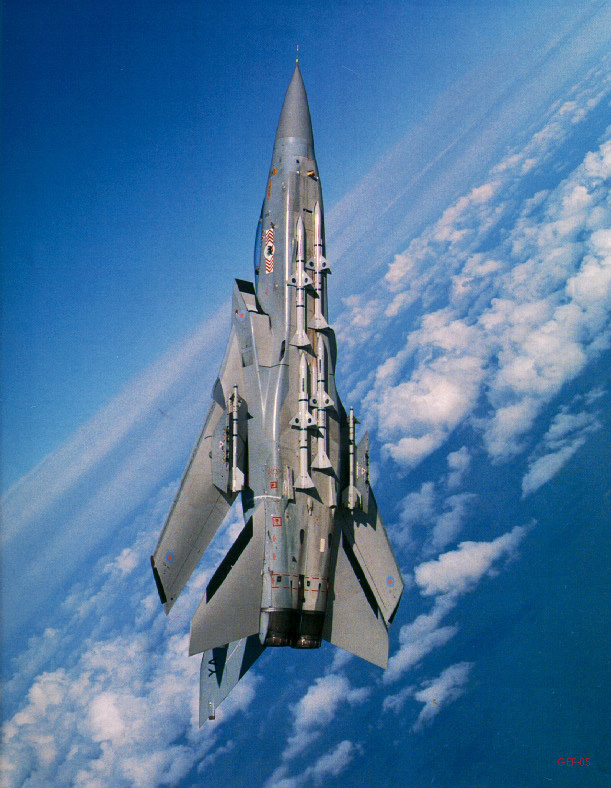
Tornado F.2 of No. 229 OCU flying at a high climb angle while making a turn to port; air-to-air missiles are on the underside of the fuselage, and two missile rails under the wings

Quantity production of the Tornado ADV started in 1980 and continued through to 1993. On 20 November 1985, the Tornado F3 made its maiden flight. Enhancements over the Tornado F2 included RB.199 Mk 104 engines, which were optimised for high-altitude use with longer afterburner tailpipes, the capacity to carry four underwing Sidewinder missiles rather than two, and automatic wing sweep control. Upon its entrance into service, the principal armament of the Tornado F3 was the short-range Sidewinder and the medium-range Skyflash missiles, the latter being a British design derived from the American AIM-7 Sparrow.

Perhaps the most prominent of the innovations incorporated into the Tornado F3 was an automatic manoeuvre device system that enabled the flight control computer to automatically adjust the level of wing sweep to maintain optimum flight characteristics. This function was similar in concept to the automatic sweeping wing (ASW) capability of the American Grumman F-14 Tomcat, a capability that greatly enhanced manoeuvrability, but was not present on any previous Tornado IDS and ADV models. During 1989, the Tornado F.3 (originally F.Mk3) was declared operational.

=== Capability Sustainment Programme ===
In order to maintain the Tornado F3 as an effective platform up to its planned phasing out date of 2010, the Ministry of Defence initiated the Capability Sustainment Programme (CSP). This £125 million project, announced on 5 March 1996, involved many elements, including the integration of the ASRAAM and AIM-120 AMRAAM air-to-air missiles, and radar upgrades to improve multi-target engagement. Additionally, it entailed improvement in pilot and navigator displays, along with the replacement of several of the onboard computer systems. The CSP saw the removal of a non-standard state of aircraft; various upgrades, in particular to the Foxhunter radar, had led to a situation described as "fleets within fleets". The Foxhunter radar caused difficulties in the upgrade programme, in particular the integration of the new AMRAAM missile.

Cost-saving decisions meant that the CSP did not fully exploit the capabilities of either the AMRAAM or ASRAAM missiles. AMRAAM typically uses two mid-course updates after launch to refresh target information prior to its own seeker taking over; however, the CSP did not include the necessary datalink to provide this capability. The ASRAAM was not fully integrated, which prevented the full off-boresight capability of the missile being used. However, in June 2001, the MoD signed a contract for a further upgrade to allow for these midcourse updates. This upgrade, together with updated IFF, was known as the AMRAAM Optimisation Programme (AOP) and was incorporated in the remaining F3 fleet between December 2003 and September 2006.

A further upgrade, disclosed in early 2003, was the integration of the ALARM anti-radiation missile to enable several Tornado ADVs to conduct Suppression of Enemy Air Defenses (SEAD) missions. The F3's existing radar warning receivers formed the basis of an Emission Location System (ELS), which can be employed to detect and locate operational radar systems in the aircraft's vicinity, while two ALARM missiles could be carried on pylons under the fuselage. Twelve aircraft, sometimes known by the unofficial designation Tornado EF3, were converted under an Urgent Operational Requirement (UOR) as part of the build up to Operation Telic, the 2003 invasion of Iraq and operated by No. 11 Squadron RAF.

=== Performance ===
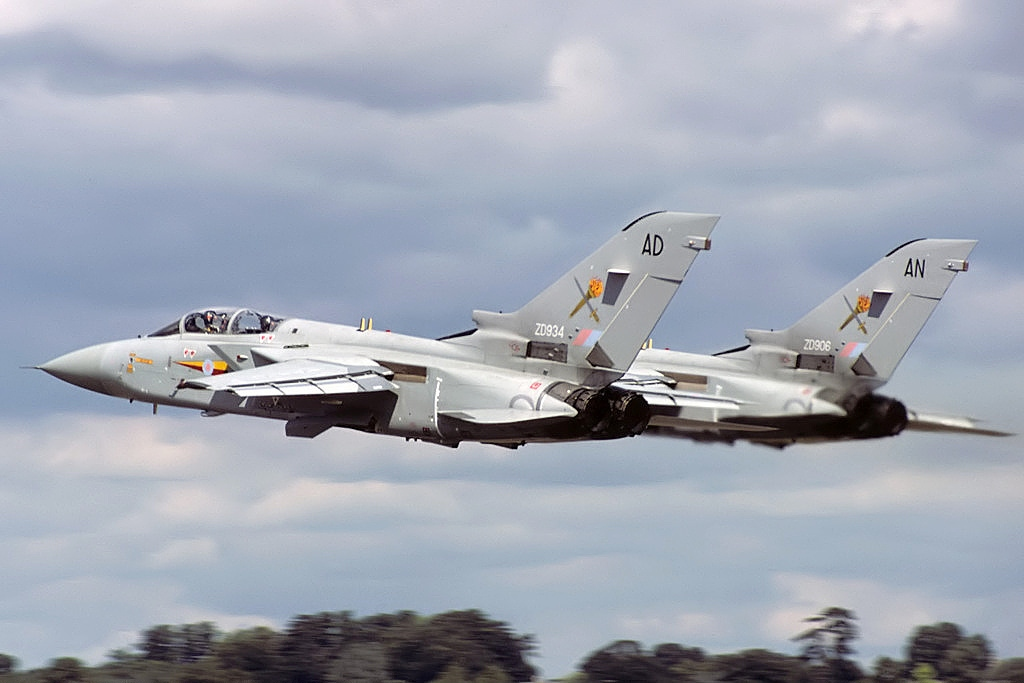
A pair of No. 229 OCU Tornado F.2s (ZD934 and ZD906) departing from RAF Fairford in 1985

According to aviation historian Michael Leek, from the onset of the type's development, the Tornado ADV encountered "...controversy and many questions over the ADV's performance and suitability - controversy which stayed with the aircraft for much of its service life".

The Tornado ADV was designed to serve in the role of an interceptor against the threat of Soviet bombers, rather than as an air superiority fighter for engaging in prolonged air combat manoeuvering with various types of enemy fighters. In order to perform its anti-bomber primary mission, it was equipped with long range beyond visual range missiles such as the Skyflash, and later the AMRAAM; the aircraft also had the ability to stay aloft for long periods and remain over the North Sea and Northern Atlantic in order to maintain its airborne patrol.

The capability of its weapon systems was a dramatic improvement over its predecessors. Compared with the Phantom, the Tornado had greater acceleration, twice the range and loiter time, and was more capable of operating from short 'austere' air strips. Older aircraft were reliant on a network of ground-based radar stations, but the F3's Foxhunter radar was capable of performing much longer and wider scans of surrounding airspace; the Tornado could track and engage targets at far greater distances. The Tornado also had the ability to share its radar and targeting information with other aircraft via JTIDS/Link 16 and was one of the first aircraft to have a digital data bus, used for the transmission of data between onboard computers.

== Operational history ==
=== Royal Air Force ===
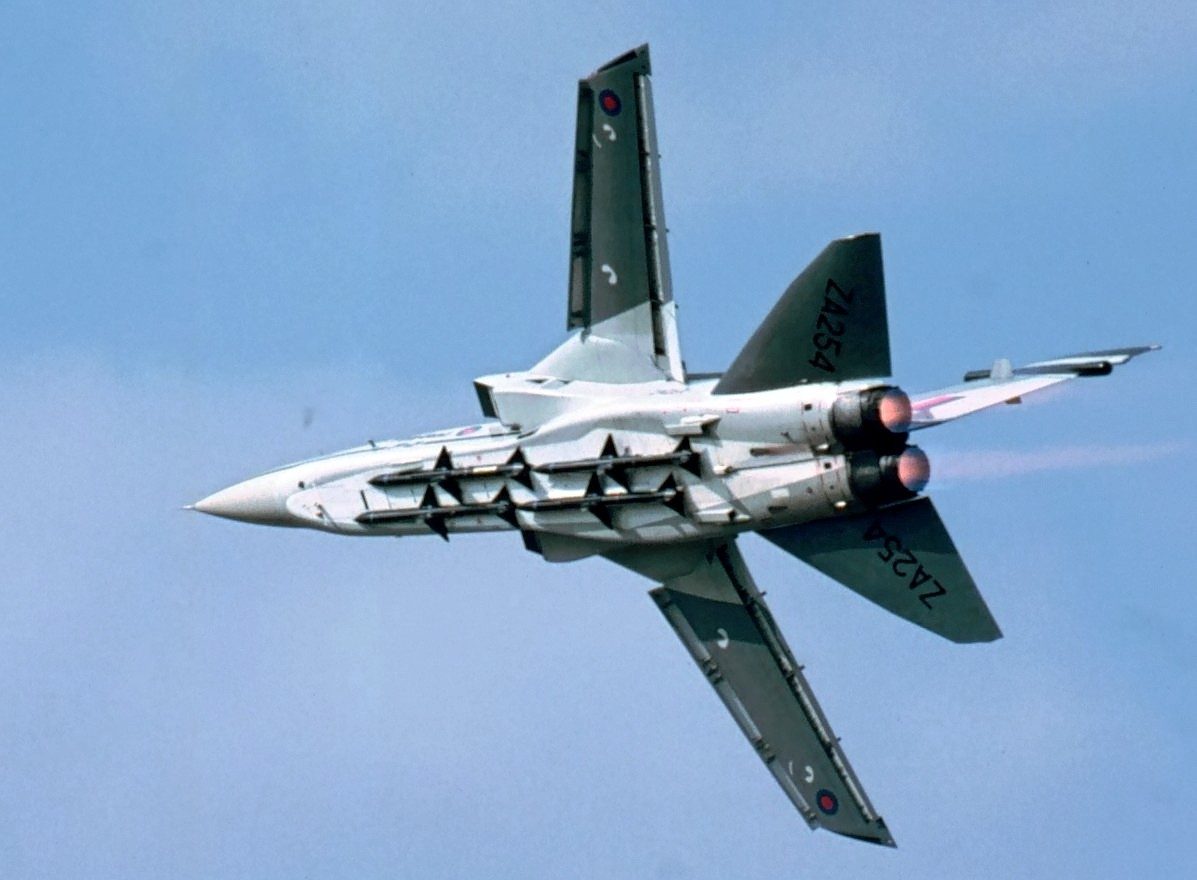
Tornado F2 in flight, September 1980. The Skyflash missiles are semi-recessed under the fuselage

On 5 November 1984, the first interim Tornado F2 was first delivered to the RAF. These aircraft were primarily for training by No. 229 Operational Conversion Unit RAF. From July 1986, the F2's short career came to an end as they were replaced as the improved Tornado F3 entered service; the interim aircraft were promptly placed into storage. Originally, the Tornado F2s were intended to be updated to Tornado F2A standard (similar to the F3, but without the engine upgrade) however, only the one F2A, the Tornado Integrated Avionics Research Aircraft (TIARA) was ever converted, having been customised by QinetiQ for unmanned aerial vehicle (UAV) trials at MoD Boscombe Down.

In November 1987, No. 29 (Fighter) Squadron became the first RAF squadron to be declared operational with the Tornado ADV. The combat debut of the Tornado F3 was made in the 1991 Gulf War; a total of 18 aircraft were deployed to Dhahran, Saudi Arabia in support of coalition forces. In order to best prepare these aircraft for active combat, they were progressively upgraded under a crash programme with improved radar, enhanced engines, superior defensive countermeasures, and multiple adaptions to the weapons systems that improved combat performance in the Iraqi theatre.

Several shortcomings with the Tornado F3 were still present during the Gulf War, such as the lack of modern IFF and secure communications equipment. Partially due to this, they largely performed patrols further back from Iraqi airspace where encounters with enemy aircraft were less likely; no Tornado F3s engaged enemy aircraft. From August 1990 to March 1991, the RAF's F3 detachment flew more than 2,000 combat air patrol sorties. In the aftermath of the Gulf War, the RAF maintained a small squadron of F3s in Saudi Arabia to continue routine patrols of Iraqi no-fly zones.

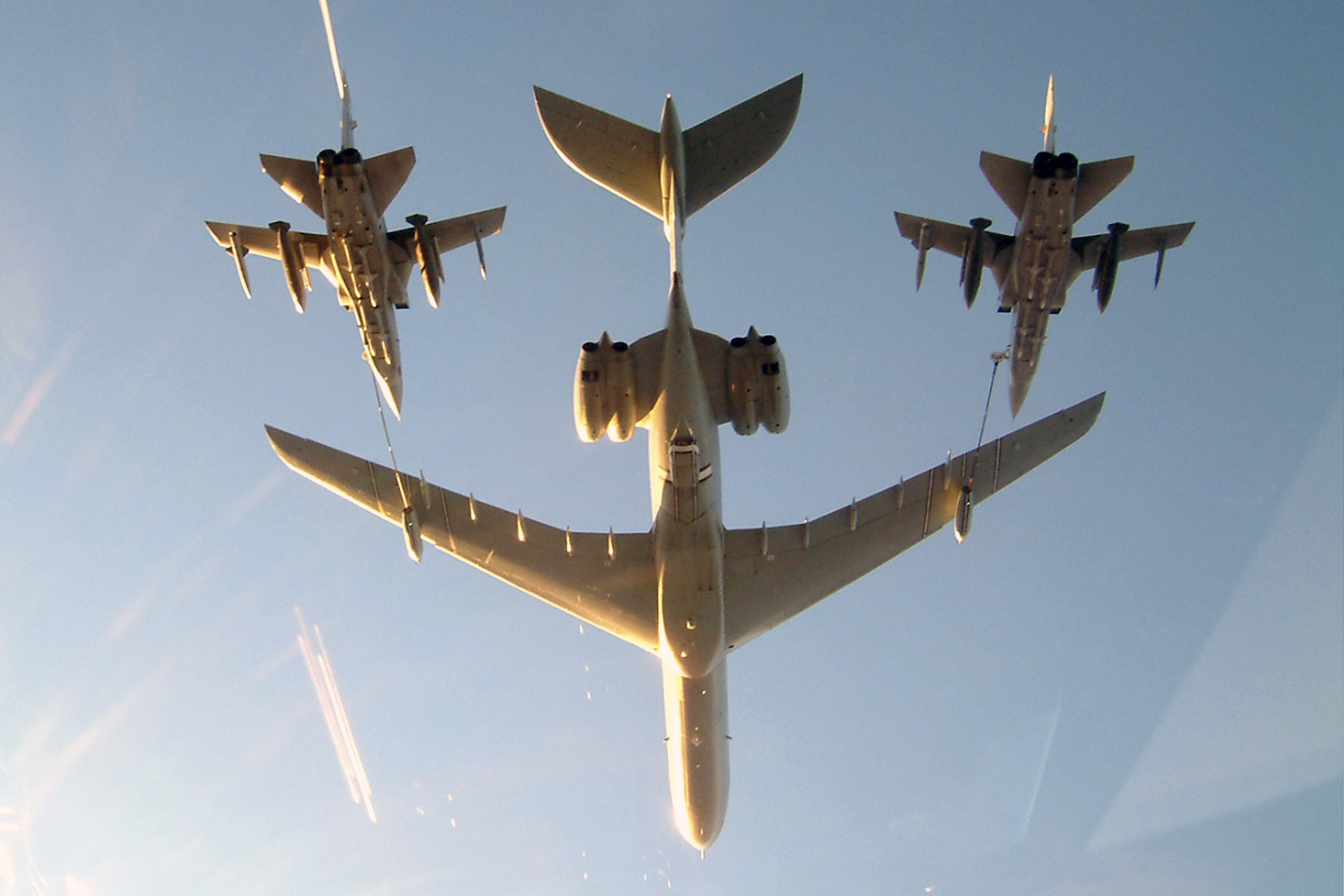
A pair of Tornado F3s refuelling from an RAF Vickers VC10 tanker, March 2003

The 1990s saw multiple occasions in which the Tornado F3 engaged in active combat. Between 1993 and 1995, several were used to escort NATO aircraft engaged in Operation Deny Flight over Bosnia; in 1999, the type conducted combat air patrols during Operation Allied Force in Yugoslavia. During these extended overseas deployments, the Tornado F3 reportedly proved troublesome to maintain at operational readiness while based outside the UK. Following lengthy delays in the Eurofighter programme to develop a successor to the F3 interceptor, the RAF initiated a major upgrade program in the late 1990s to enhance the aircraft's capabilities, primarily by integrating several newer air-to-air missiles.

During 2003, the Tornado F3 was one of the assets used in Operation Telic, Britain's contribution to the Iraq War. An expeditionary force composed of No. 43 (F) and No. 111 (F) Squadrons (known as Leuchars Fighter Wing), and No. 11 Squadron RAF and No. 25 Squadron RAF (known as Leeming Fighter Wing), was deployed to the region to carry out offensive counter-air operations. The Tornado F3's of Leuchars Fighter Wing operated all over Iraq, including missions over and around Baghdad, throughout Operation Telic. Due to a lack of airborne threats materialising in the theatre, the F3s were withdrawn and returned to European bases that same year.

As part of the Delivering Security in a Changing World White Paper, on 21 July 2004, Defence Secretary Geoff Hoon detailed plans to reduce the number of Tornado F3 squadrons by one to three squadrons. This represented 16 aircraft and was the first stage in the transition to the F3's replacement, the Eurofighter Typhoon, which entered operational service with the RAF in 2005. In April 2009, it was announced that the Tornado F3 force would be reduced to one squadron of 12 aircraft in September 2009. The last operational Tornado F3s in RAF service were retired when No. 111 (F) Squadron, located at RAF Leuchars, was disbanded on 22 March 2011.

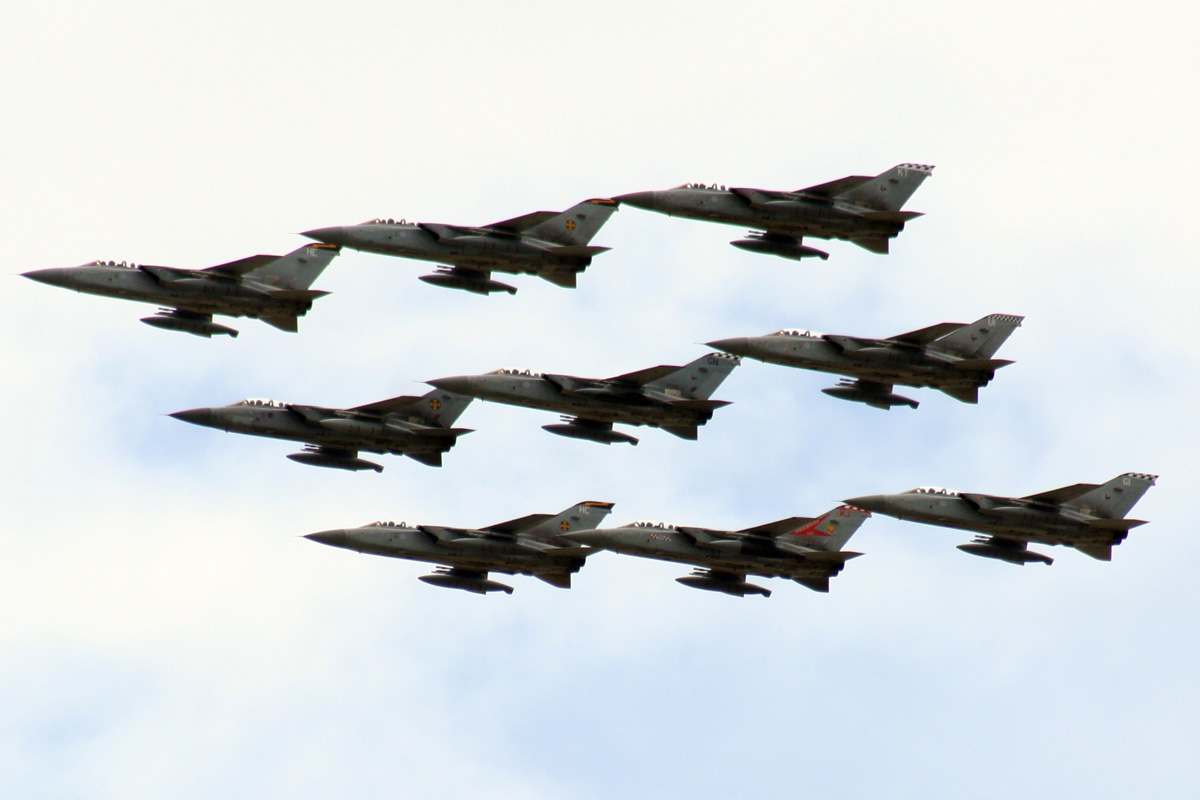
A formation of nine Tornado F3, July 2008

In addition to the RAF's Tornado F3s, in 2007, QinetiQ leased four Tornado F3s from the MOD for the purpose of conducting weapons testing activities. QinetiQ's force of four F3s remained flying beyond the RAF's retirement of the type, in their latter service they were being used for aerial testing of the new MBDA Meteor air-to-air missile, and thus were the only flying examples in the UK for a time. Their final mission was flown on 20 June 2012, and the last three flown to RAF Leeming for scrapping on 9 July 2012.

=== Italian Air Force ===
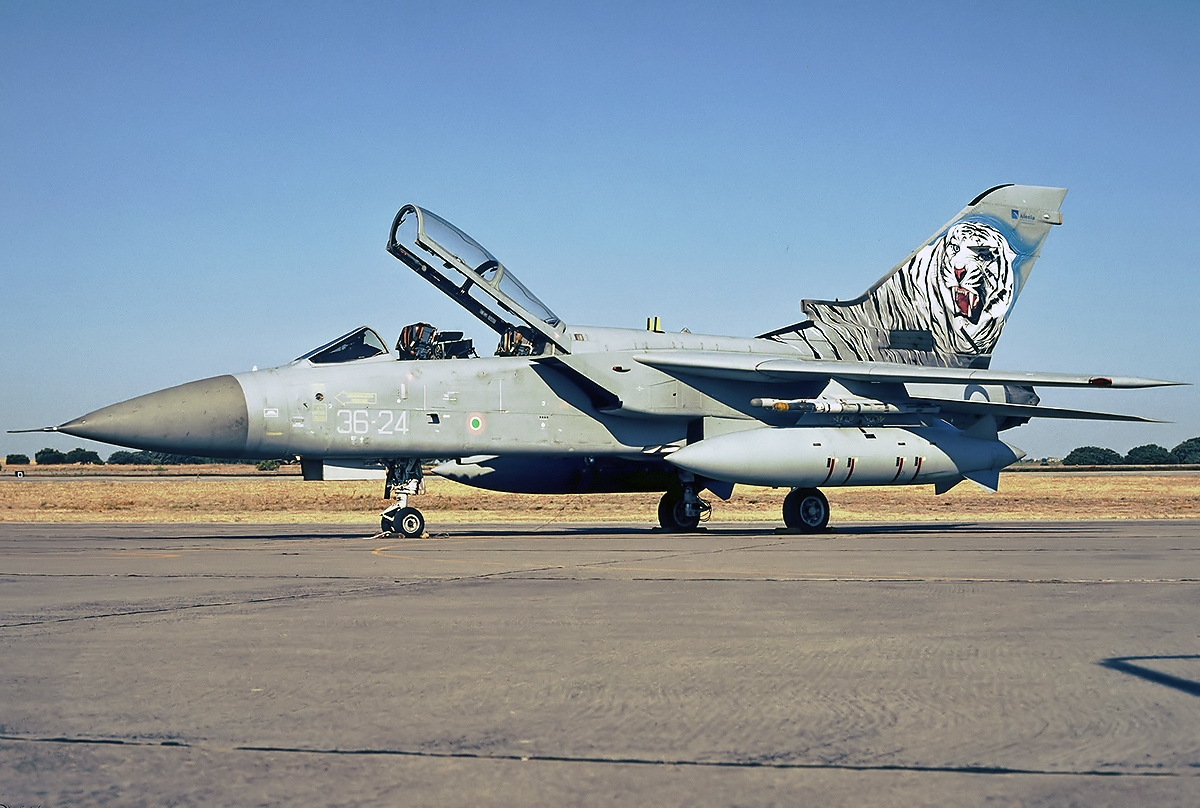
Italian Air Force Tornado ADV MM7234 of 36º Stormo at Gioia del Colle Air Base, Italy

In the early 1990s, the Italian Air Force (Aeronautica Militare Italiana, or AMI) identified a requirement for a fighter to boost its air defence capabilities pending introduction of the Eurofighter Typhoon, expected around 2000. These fighters were to operate alongside the service's obsolescent F-104ASA Starfighters. The Tornado ADV was selected from, amongst others, the F-16. On 17 November 1993, Italy signed an agreement with the RAF to lease 24 Tornado F3s from the RAF for a period of ten years. The lease included 96 Sky Flash TEMP missiles (a lower standard than the version in RAF service), training, logistical supply for ADV-specific equipment and access to the RAF facility at Saint Athan.

During March 1995, the training of the first AMI pilots commenced at RAF Coningsby while technicians gained experience at RAF Cottesmore and Coningsby. On 5 July 1995, the first aircraft was accepted by the AMI and was flown to its Italian base the same day. Delivery of the first batch was completed by the end of year; these aircraft were deployed at Gioia del Colle in Southern Italy. The second batch was delivered between February and July 1997, these aircraft were of a slightly higher specification. In early 1997, the AMI announced that it was cancelling a series of scheduled upgrades to its Tornado fleet, stating that it was placing priority for funding on the in-development Eurofighter instead.

The Tornado proved to be fairly unreliable in Italian service, reportedly achieving serviceability rates of 50% or less. Air Forces Monthly this attributed the poor performance to the AMI having underestimated the different support requirements of the aircraft versus the Tornado IDS, a lack of spare engines (which were not included in the lease agreement), and a lack of equipment.

During 2000, amid considerable delays in the Eurofighter programme, the AMI started its search for another interim fighter. While the Tornado ADV was a candidate once again, any long term extension to the lease arrangement would have involved the associated aircraft to be upgraded to RAF CSP standard along with structural modifications to extend the airframes' service life, officials considered such commitments to not be cost effective. In February 2001, Italy announced it was set to lease 35 F-16s from the United States as its new interim fighter. Accordingly, the AMI returned its Tornados to the RAF; the final aircraft arrived at RAF Saint Athan on 7 December 2004. A single aircraft was retained by the Italian Air Force for static display purposes.

=== Royal Saudi Air Force ===
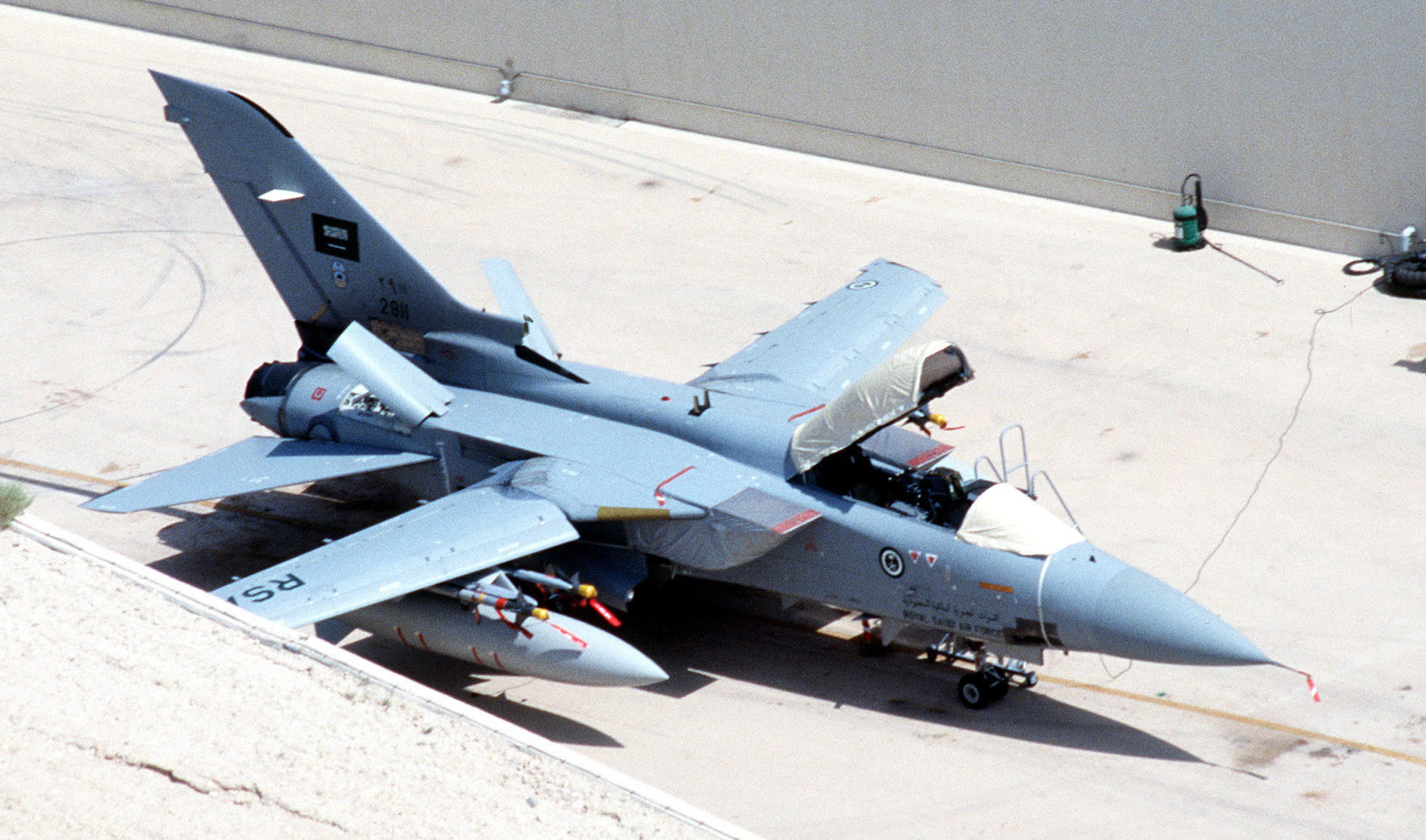
Tornado F3 2911 of the Royal Saudi Air Force sitting on the flight line during Operation Desert Shield

On 26 September 1985, Saudi Arabia and Britain signed a memorandum of understanding towards what would be widely known as the Al-Yamamah arms deal, for the provision of various military equipment and services. The September 1985 deal involved the purchase of a large number of Tornado aircraft; including the Tornado ADV variant, along with armaments, radar equipment, spare parts and a pilot-training programme for the inbound fleet, in exchange for providing 600,000 barrels of oil per day over the course of several years. The first Al-Yamamah agreement ordered 24 Tornado ADVs and 48 Tornado IDSs. The RSAF received its first ADV on 9 February 1989.

U.S. analyst Anthony Cordesman commented that "the Tornado ADV did not prove to be a successful air defence fighter... The RSAF's experience with the first eight Tornado ADVs was negative". In 1990, the RSAF signed several agreements with the US to later receive deliveries of the McDonnell Douglas F-15E Strike Eagle, and thus had a reduced need for the Tornado ADV; Saudi Arabia chose to convert further orders for up to 60 Tornado ADVs to the IDS strike variant instead.

During 1991, during Operation Desert Storm over neighbouring Iraq, RSAF Tornado ADVs flew 451 air-defence sorties, operating in conjunction with RSAF F-15s. In 2006, it was announced that, in addition to Saudi Arabia's contract to purchase the Eurofighter Typhoon, both the Tornado IDS and ADV fleets would undergo a £2.5 billion program of upgrades, allowing them to remain in service to at least 2020. Despite this, by 2011, the Eurofighter had taken over from the Tornado ADV in the air-defence role.

== Variants ==
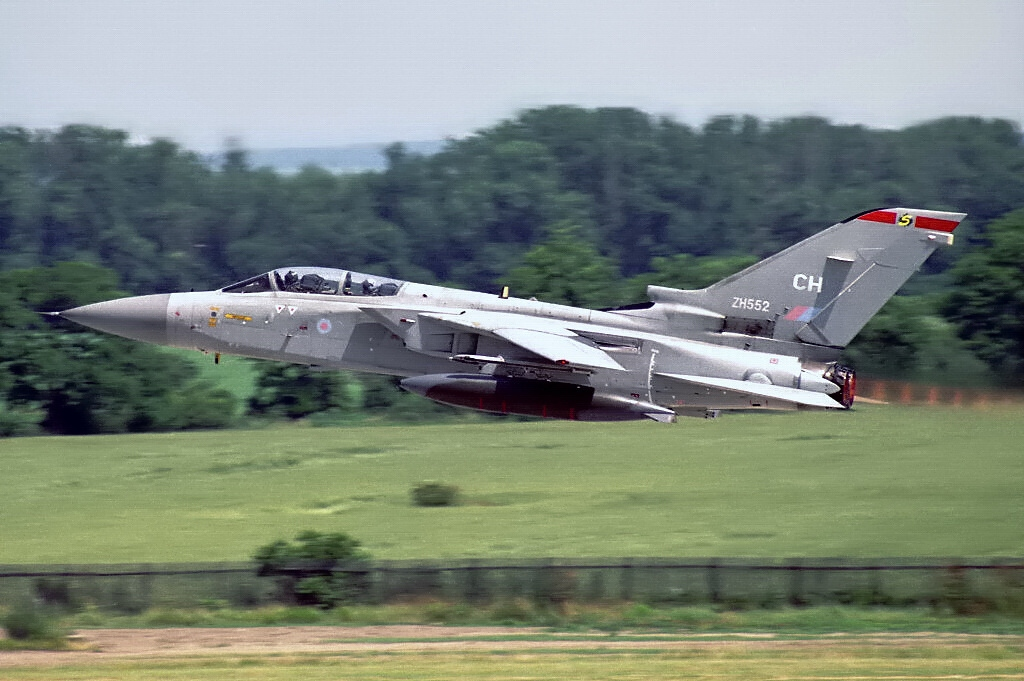
Tornado F3 ZH552 of No. V (AC) Squadron at Bratislava, Slovakia, June 1999

Tornado F2
Two-seat all-weather interceptor fighter aircraft, powered by two Turbo-Union RB.199-34R Mk 103 turbofan engines. Initial production version, 18 built.
Tornado F2A
F2 upgrade to F3 standard, but retaining F2 engines, one converted.
Tornado F3
Improved version, powered by two Turbo-Union RB.199-34R Mk 104 engines, with automatic wing sweep control, increased AIM-9 carriage and avionics upgrades. 171 built for the Royal Air force (RAF) and Royal Saudi Air Force (RSAF).
Tornado EF3
Unofficial designation for F3 aircraft modified with ALARM missile capability.

== Operators ==
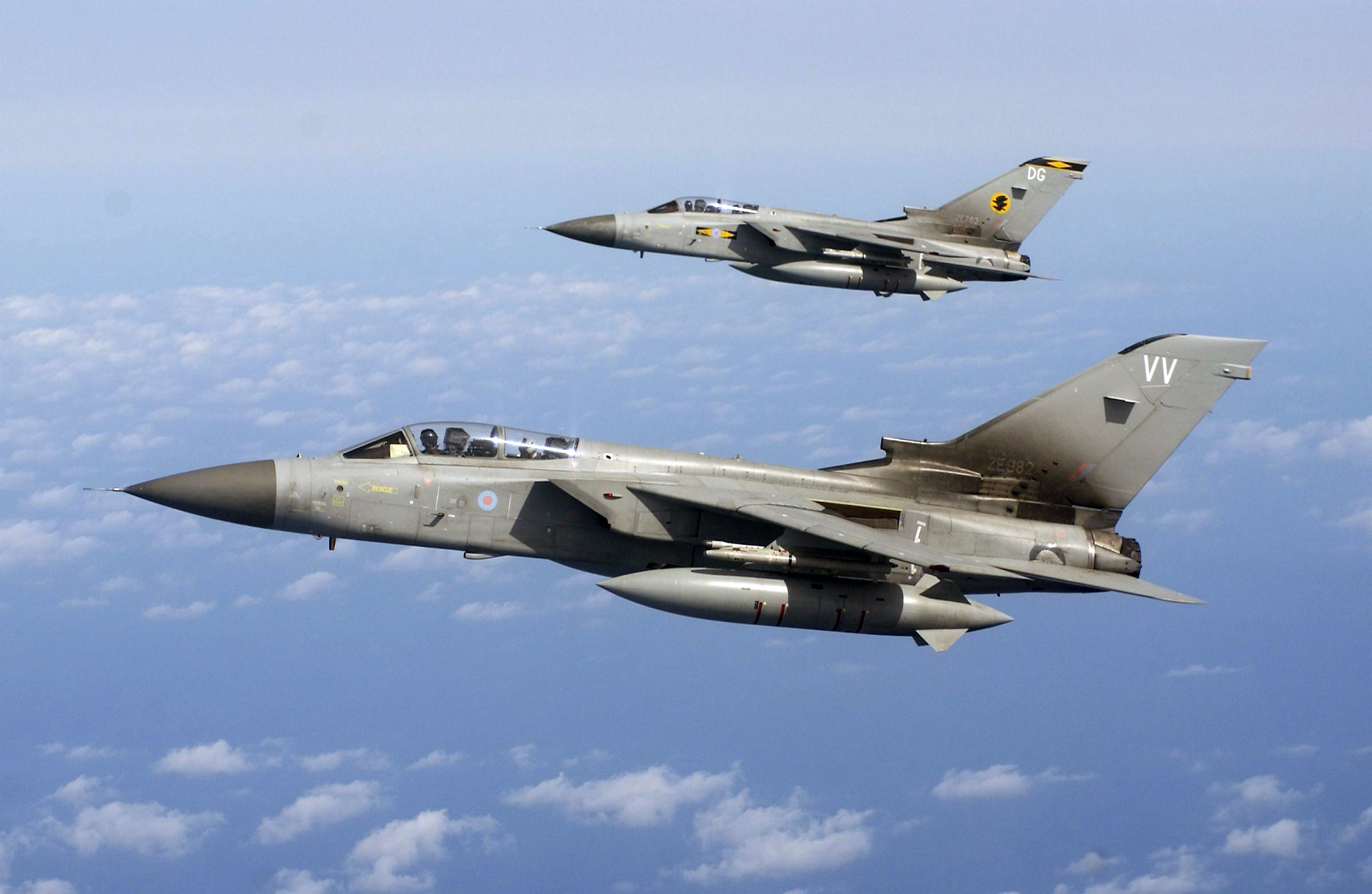
A pair of Tornado F3 aircraft (ZE982 of No. XXV (F) Sqn and ZE763 of No. XI (F) Sqn) in formation flight, March 2005

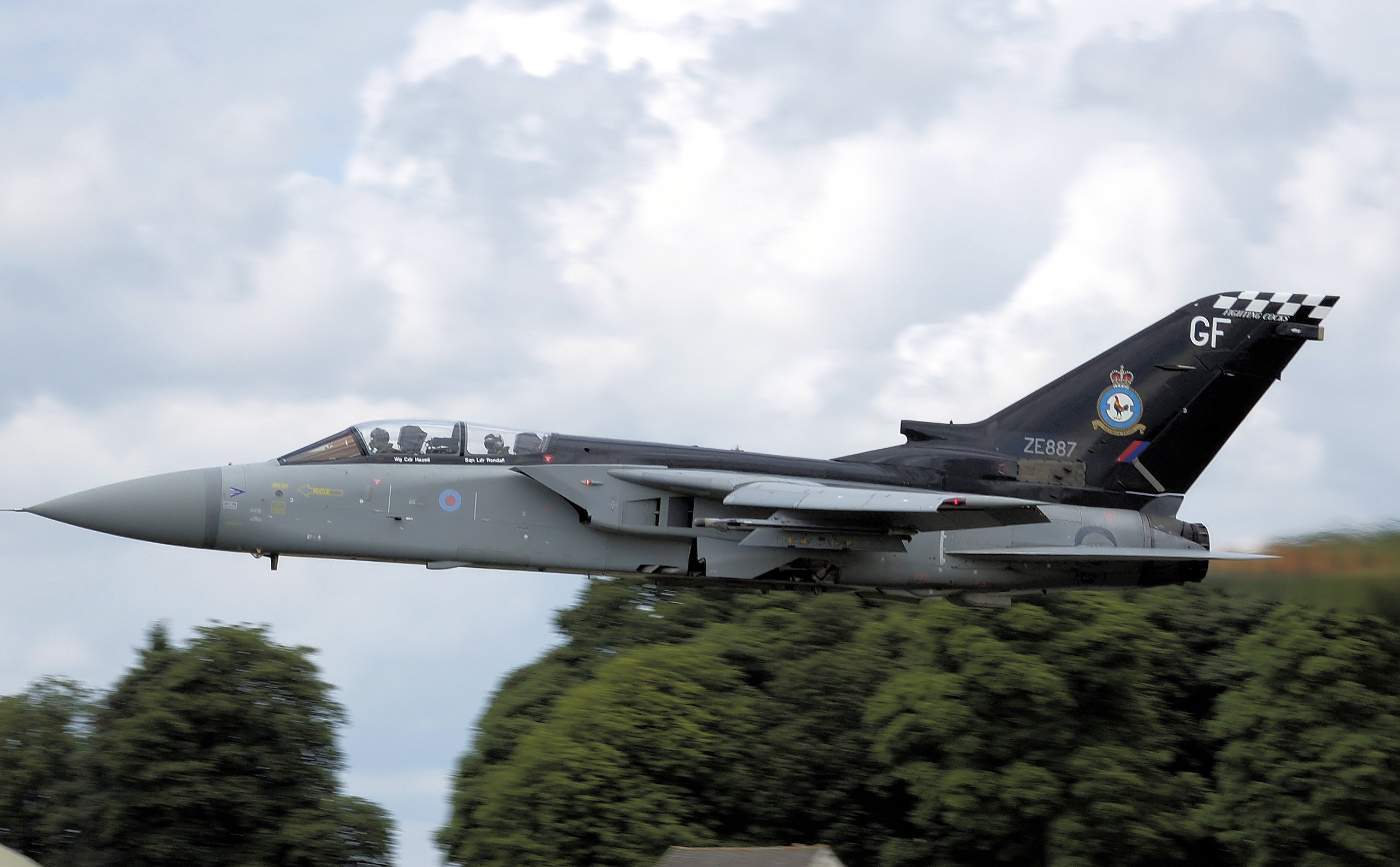
No. 43 (F) Squadron Tornado F3 ZE887 takes off at Kemble Air Day, June 2008

Italy

- Italian Air Force (1995–2004)
  - Gioia del Colle Air Base, Bari
    - 12° Gruppo (1995–2004)
    - 21° Gruppo (1999–2001)
  - Cameri Air Base, Novara
    - 21° Gruppo (1997–1999)

Saudi Arabia

- Royal Saudi Air Force (1989–2006)
  - Dhahran Airfield, Eastern Province
    - 29th Squadron (1989–2006)
    - 34th Squadron (1989–1992)

United Kingdom

- Royal Air Force (1979–2011)
  - RAF Coningsby, Lincolnshire, England
    - No. V (AC) Squadron (1987–2003)
    - No. 29 (F) Squadron (1987–1998)
    - F3 Operational Evaluation Unit (F3 OEU) (1987–2004)
    - Fast Jet & Weapons Operational Evaluation Unit (FJWOEU) (2004–2006)
    - No. 41 (R) Squadron (2006–2011)
    - No. 65 (R) Squadron (Shadow identity of No. 229 OCU) (1986–1992)
    - No. 56 (R) Squadron (1992–2003)
    - No. 229 Operational Conversion Unit RAF (1984–2003)
  - RAF Leeming, North Yorkshire, England
    - No. XI (F) Squadron (1988–2005)
    - No. 23 (F) Squadron (1988–1994)
    - No. XXV (F) Squadron (1989–2008)
  - RAF Leuchars, Fife, Scotland
    - No. 43 (F) Squadron (1989–2009)
    - No. 56 (R) Squadron (2003–2008)
    - No. 111 (F) Squadron (1990–2011)
  - RAF Mount Pleasant, East Falkland, Falkland Islands
    - No. 1435 Flight (1992–2009)

== Specifications (Tornado F3) ==
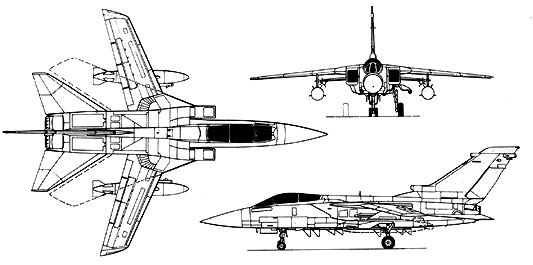
Tornado ADV 3-view drawing

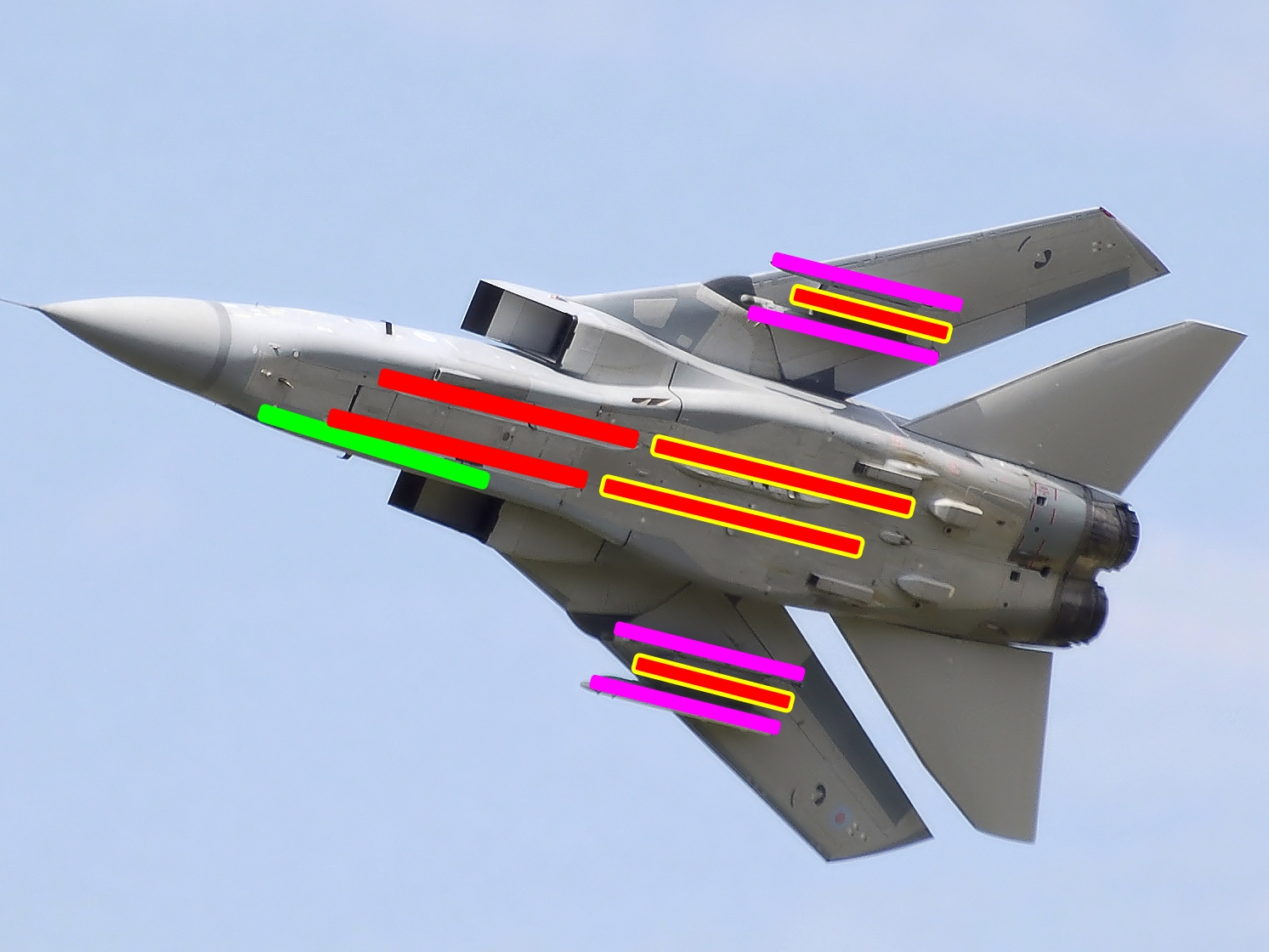
Highlighted hardpoint and under-wing weapon locations of the Tornado ADV

Data from Jane's All The World's Aircraft 1993–94,

General characteristics

- Crew: 2
- Length: 18.68 m (61 ft 3 in)
- Wingspan: 13.91 m (45 ft 8 in) at 25° sweep

8.6 m (28 ft) at 67° sweep

- Height: 5.95 m (19 ft 6 in)
- Wing area: 26.6 m^{2} (286 sq ft)
- Empty weight: 14,500 kg (31,967 lb)
- Max takeoff weight: 27,986 kg (61,699 lb)
- Powerplant: 2 × Turbo-Union RB199-34R afterburning 3-spool turbofan, 40.5 kN (9,100 lbf) thrust each dry, 73.5 kN (16,500 lbf) with afterburner

Performance

- Maximum speed: 2,400 km/h (1,500 mph, 1,300 kn) / M2.2 at 9,000 m (30,000 ft)

1,482 km/h (921 mph; 800 kn) near sea level

- Combat range: 1,853 km (1,151 mi, 1,001 nmi) subsonic

>556 km (345 mi) supersonic

- Ferry range: 4,265 km (2,650 mi, 2,303 nmi) with four external tanks
- Endurance: Two hour combat air patrol at 560–740 km (348–460 mi) from base
- Service ceiling: 15,240 m (50,000 ft)

Armament

- Guns
  - 1 × 27 mm (1.063 in) Mauser BK-27 revolver cannon with 180 rounds
- Hardpoints: 10 total (4× semi-recessed under-fuselage, 2× under-wing, 4× under-wing shoulder rail)
  - 4× AIM-9 Sidewinder or ASRAAM (mounted on shoulder rail hardpoints)
  - 4× British Aerospace Skyflash or AIM-120 AMRAAM (mounted on 4 semi-recessed under-fuselage hardpoints)
- Others:
  - Up to 2× drop tanks for extended range/loitering time. Up to 4 drop tanks for ferry role (at the expense of 4 Skyflash/AMRAAM).

Avionics

- GEC-Marconi/Ferranti AI.24 Foxhunter radar

== See also ==
External videos
- Documentary on the Panavia Tornado ADV
- A Tornado F3 performing an aerobatic display in Sussex, 2005
- Footage of Tornado F3 squadron operations

Related development

- Panavia Tornado IDS
- Panavia Tornado ECR

Aircraft of comparable role, configuration, and era

- Dassault Mirage 2000
- Grumman F-14 Tomcat ADC
- McDonnell Douglas F-15 Eagle
- Mikoyan-Gurevich MiG-23
- Mikoyan MiG-31
