= Inverse monopulse seeker =

Missile guidance system

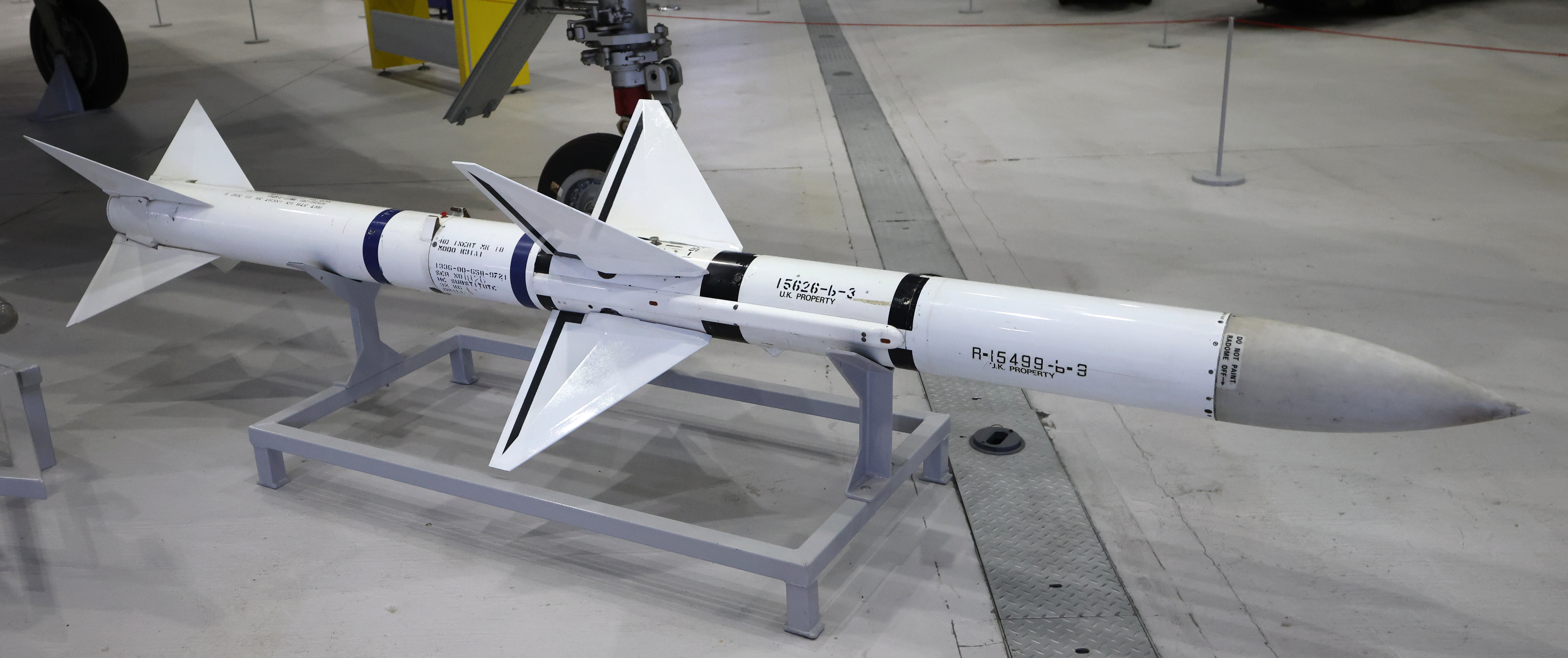
Skyflash missile equipped with inverse monopulse seeker

An inverse monopulse seeker is a type of semi-active radar homing that offers significant advantages over earlier designs. The system requires electronics that can compare three signals at once, so this design did not become practically possible until the early 1970s. One of the first such examples was the Soviet Union R-40 air-to-air missiles used in MiG-25P introduced in service in 1970 and RAF's Skyflash missile introduced in 1978, an adaptation of the AIM-7 Sparrow that replaced the original Raytheon seeker with a monopulse model from Marconi, followed by a very similar conversion by Selenia for the Italian Aspide. The USAF adopted similar technology in the M model of the AIM-7 Sparrow, and such designs are universal in semi-active designs today.

== Concept ==
=== Conical scanning ===
In order to home in on a target, a semi-active seeker relies on the reflection of radar signals being provided by the launching aircraft. One can visualize such a signal as a cone-shaped reflection off the target, and the missile will see this signal if it is anywhere within that cone. In order to approach the target within its warhead's lethal range, the missile needs some way to distinguish where the target is within that cone-shaped area.

The traditional solution to this problem is to use conical scanning. In this system, the receiver is connected not to a single receiver antenna, but two, pointed slightly on either side of the missile's centerline, or boresight. They are arranged so the signal will be stronger if the target is located directly along one of these two lines of shoot. If the target is to one side, say the right, the signal from the right antenna will be stronger than the left.

The missile can guide itself by turning towards the stronger of the two signals, and when it is pointed directly at the target, the two signals will become equal. To guide in two dimensions, the antenna is spun. At any given instant, the two antennas might be horizontal and the seeker will command a left or right turn towards the target; an instant later they will be vertical and adjust the flight up and down. In this fashion, the missile seeks its target in a rapid circular motion. This is typically smoothed out in the control system to provide steady control inputs.

There are numerous problems with this method of tracking. For one, it relies on the difference in signal strength between the two antennas being due only to the position of the target within the beam. There are a number of reasons this might not be the case, for instance, while the target flies through rain.

This problem becomes more acute as the missile approaches the target. At close range the antenna begins to see only portions of the aircraft as it spins. For instance, when the antenna is in the 12 o'clock position it might receive a strong return from the aircraft's vertical tail, but by the time it reaches the 3 o'clock position the reflection off the wing might dominate. Over the period of one complete rotation, the signal is now highly variable, an effect known as glint. This effect limits the accuracy of this method to about 10 metres (33 ft) at the absolute best, demanding that missiles with such a seeker have very large warheads.

Another serious problem is that the seeker cannot tell the difference between a signal reflecting off the aircraft and one reflecting off other objects. This is not a major problem in one-on-one combat at high altitudes, but if the missile is shot at a target below the launch aircraft, it will eventually approach a point where it can no longer distinguish between the reflections from the aircraft and the ground around it. As the ground is much larger than an aircraft, this signal can overwhelm the seeker whenever it is being used at low altitudes. This can be addressed to a degree using a range gate, which mutes signals outside a selected distance, but this has problems when the range to the target and the ground is the same.

Additionally, the target aircraft can release random pulses of signal that will have the same effect as glint, confusing the seeker which sees both the reflected signal and the ones from the jammer with no way to distinguish them. This makes such seekers very easy to "jam". Chaff instead creates multiple signals in the radar's view, once again leaving the seeker with no way to distinguish among them.

=== Inverse monopulse technique ===
One way to avoid many of these problems is to use the monopulse radar technique. In these systems, the radar signal is split in two before it is sent to the antennas. The two paths include some form of encoding that remains intact after reflecting off the target. Polarization is a common solution. The signal is then re-mixed and sent out of the antenna.

Two antennas receive the mixed signal after reflecting off the target. Filters then split the received signal back into two components, and a comparison of relative strengths can be made as before. However, if the signals are directional, as in the case of polarization, there is no need to spin the antenna – the difference between the signals can be used to determine the directionality. In real-world systems, four antennas are used: two to compare left-right, and two for up-down.

The main advantage to this technique is that reflection off the ground randomizes the polarization of the signal. Some will be returned with the "proper" polarization, but the vast majority will end up being filtered out in the receivers. Even though the signal returned from a target aircraft may be tiny in comparison to the total ground reflection, after filtering it becomes visible again. This allows such radars to track targets below the fighter, giving it "look-down, shoot-down" capabilities.

The filtering also makes it much more difficult for electronic countermeasures to work effectively. Since only the signal with the matching polarity will make it through the filters, typical unpolarized pulses will normally be filtered out. To work against such a radar, the jammer has to either match the polarization of the signal, or broadcast so much signal that it randomly has enough energy with the correct polarization to get through the filters.

Finally, glint is significantly reduced. Glint occurs because the antennas are sensitive in only a single direction at a time, and as they spin they see signals from different parts of the aircraft. Monopulse receivers do not spin, and see the entire return at all times. Although they still see different signal strengths from different locations, this does not change as the missile approaches its target, so the missile is not being continually commanded to change direction. In testing, the majority of Skyflash missiles hit the target aircraft directly, compared to the original AIM-7's conical scanning solution which brought the missile to within 20 to 30 metres (66–98 ft). Additionally, it was able to attack aircraft flying at 1,000 feet (300 m) altitude, a limit selected to allow tracking cameras to see the target. These tests demonstrated there was no practical lower altitude limit to the technique.

The downside to the inverse monopulse seeker is twofold. For one, it requires the radar on the launch platform to have monopulse encoding, or there will be no directional signal for the seeker to process. This links such missiles to their aircraft more tightly than the more generalist conical scanning systems which can be used with any radar the seeker can tune in. More importantly, the seeker is more complex and requires more electronics, which was not possible in the era of vacuum tube electronics and only became practical in the 1970s. For instance, the Skyflash receiver had a single fixed antenna, but required four receivers, one for each "channel", as well as comparator electronics to generate three signals, one with the sum of all the signals, and two with the differences.
