= Scintillation =

Scintillation can refer to:

- Scintillation (astronomy), atmospheric effects which influence astronomical observations
- Interplanetary scintillation, fluctuations of radio waves caused by the solar wind
- Scintillation (physics), a flash of light produced in certain materials when they absorb ionizing radiation
- Scintillation (radar), an apparent rapid target displacement occurring on radar displays
- Scintillation (medicine), a rapidly oscillating pattern of visual distortions, often associated with migraine aura
- Scintillation counter, a device that measures ionizing radiation
- Scintillating grid illusion, an image in which compounded color contrasts cause an optical illusion of visual artifacts

== See also ==
- Scintillate (horse), a British-trained thoroughbred racehorse
