= S225XR =

Medium-range air-to-air missile concept

S225XR was a wingless, integrated rocket/ramjet powered, active radar-guided medium-range air-to-air missile concept initially proposed by a BAe Dynamics-led team to meet the United Kingdom Ministry of Defence's requirement for a missile to arm the Eurofighter. S225XR was the ultimate in a series of proposed developments of the BAe Dynamics Skyflash, pursued jointly by the UK and Sweden since the late 1970s.

In 1978 Sweden bought the rights to Skyflash, known as Rb 71 in Flygvapnet service, from BAe. Sweden's Defence Materiel Administration (FMV) subsequently began an independent development of Skyflash with a new active seeker, with BAe acting as a sub-contractor to Sweden's Saab Dynamics.

In 1984 the FMV began renewed studies of their active seeker design, the Rb 71A, or Sky Flash 90, and the all-new wingless ramjet-powered Rb 73. A Memorandum of Understanding was signed with BAe Dynamics that same year to co-operate on Rb 73 development. Studies were conducted on longer range designs with wings and datalinks, the Rb 73D/Rb 73DL. A lack of FMV funding brought the Rb 73 programme to a halt in 1987.

In 1988 BAe Dynamics and Thomson-CSF (now Thales) agreed to jointly fund development of a version of Skyflash with an active radar seeker. The Active Sky Flash (ASF) was to include a Thomson-CSF seeker and a new warhead developed by LFK, the guided missile division of Daimler-Benz Aerospace (DASA) now known as MBDA Deutschland GmbH. Concepts progressed from the basic ASF to the agile tail-controlled ASF TC Mk. II. Prototype seekers were delivered in 1990 with air-carriage trials in 1991.

Saab Dynamics continued to refine the Rb 73 design using company funds and renewed links were established with BAe Dynamics, to meet the emerging requirement to arm the RAF's Eurofighters. As Eurofighter became the driver behind the missile's development, BAe took charge of the programme. ASF was terminated in 1992 to be replaced by a new wingless concept known as S225X, the name deriving from the internal postal code of the BAe project manager's office at Stevenage.

S225X was first unveiled at the 1992 Farnborough Air Show. GEC-Marconi Dynamics and Alenia Difesa joined the programme in 1993. In 1994 a ramjet powered version, known as S225XR, was proposed in response to the UK requirement for a future medium-range air-to-air missile for Eurofighter. This team became part of the European group which eventually won the competition with Meteor.
