= AI.24 Foxhunter =

British aircraft interception radar

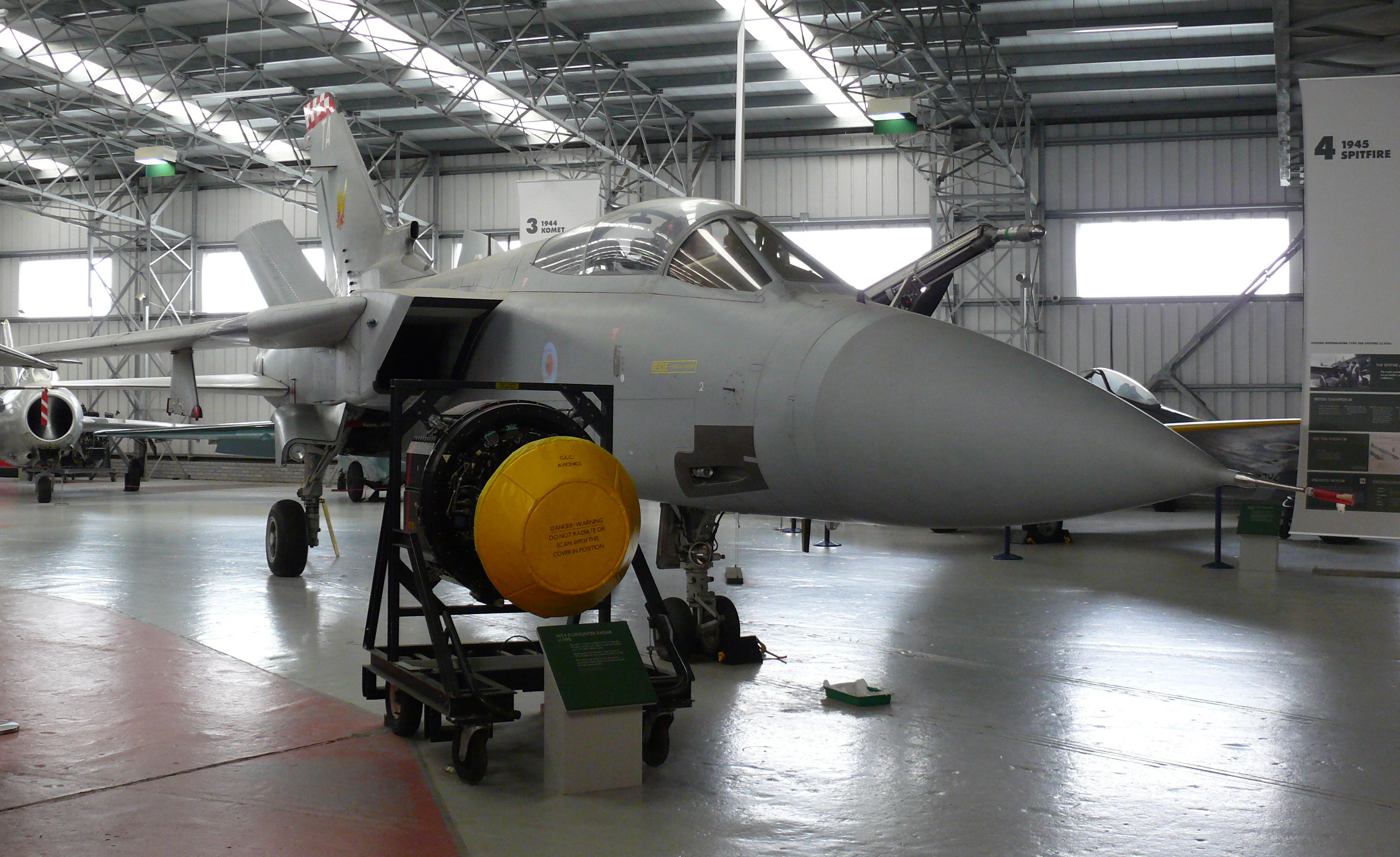
- AI.24 Foxhunter along with a Panavia Tornado ADV
- Country of origin: UK
- Introduced: 1981
- Type: Pulse-Doppler FMICW
- Other names: Foxhunter

The AI.24 Foxhunter was an aircraft interception (AI) radar carried by the Panavia Tornado ADV fighter aircraft (known as the Tornado F3 in Royal Air Force service), which gave it an all-weather, day-and-night, beyond-visual-range engagement capability.

== Production ==
The radar was manufactured by GEC-Marconi subsidiaries and other partners, with major parts from Ferranti. Despite initial problems, (the radar was several years late and 60% over budget) successive upgrades constantly improved the RAF's Tornado F3 fleet.

== Development ==
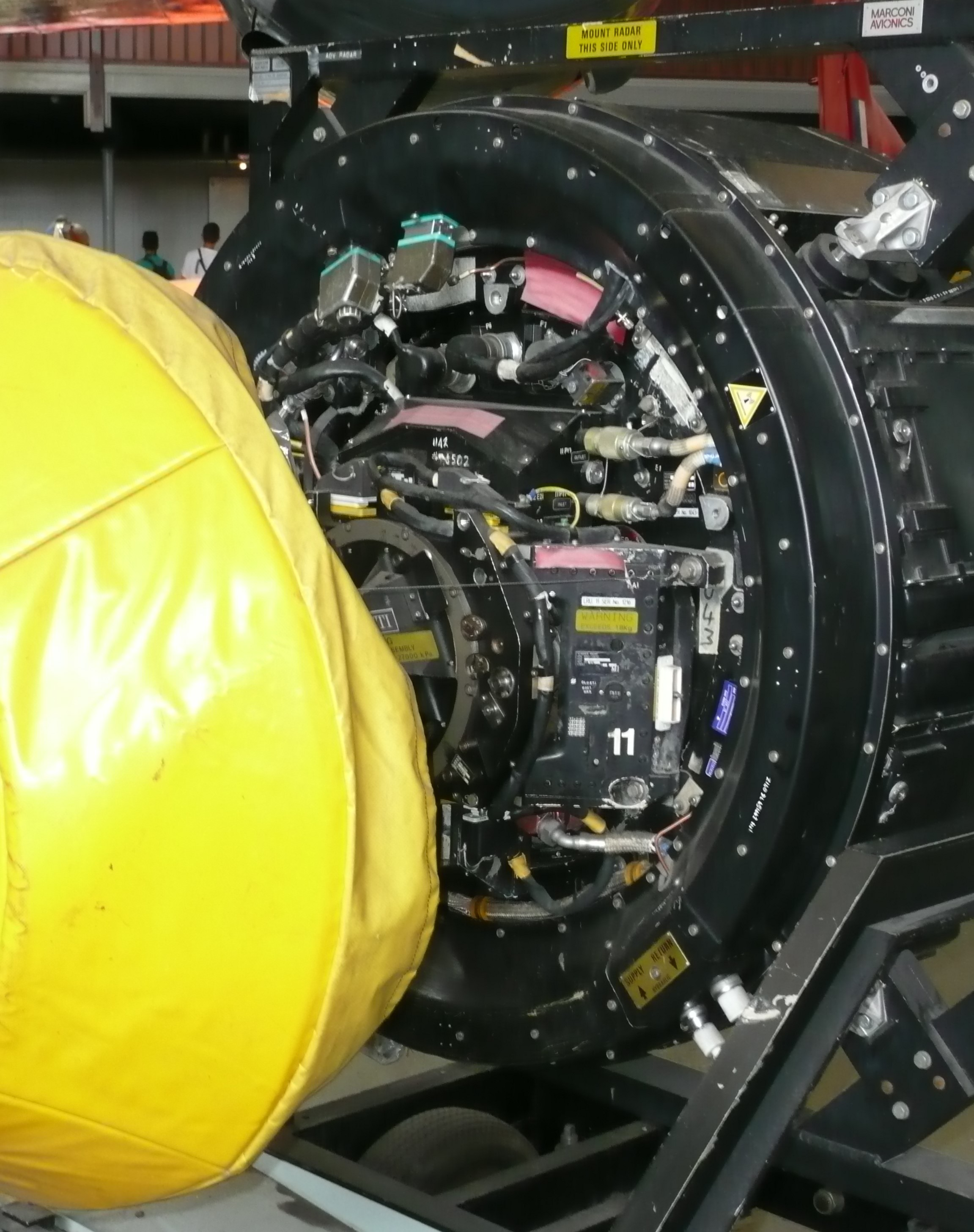
AI.24 Foxhunter radar

Much of the radar system and related operational software was developed at the Radar Research Laboratory of GEC-Marconi Elliott Avionic Systems Ltd., initially at the Elliott Automation plant in Borehamwood, Hertfordshire, United Kingdom, and latterly (from 1981 to 2004) as Marconi Avionics at the (formerly the Xerox site of a matrix of interconnected grey portacabins and a few factory units) facility on Monks Way, Linford Wood, Milton Keynes. This site has changed completely in the years since, but there is now a Foxhunter Drive starting where the high security gate was.

== History ==
The radar was flight tested on a Hawker Siddeley Buccaneer and first flew in a Tornado F.2 in June 1981.

=== Contractual relationships ===
In 1987 GEC argued that the contractual relationships were partly to blame for the delay in the Foxhunter entering service – although GEC was responsible for most of the radar, Ferranti manufactured the antenna platform (the scanner less the antenna) and transmitter and reported to the Ministry of Defence who acted as the prime contactor. A new contract was signed in March 1988 and described as "tight" (i.e. not lenient towards Marconi) by the Financial Times.

=== Production delays ===
Production Tornado F.2s had concrete ballast in place of the Foxhunter radar, due to the development delays. This ballast became known as the "Blue Circle radar", a play on words from a British brand of cement by the same name, and the Rainbow Codes previously used for British radars.

The UK's Tornado F3 fleet were ultimately equipped with "Stage 3 AI.24s".
