= AA6 =

AA-6 or AA6 may refer to:

- Bisnovat R-40, a Soviet long-range air-to-air missile whose NATO reporting name is the AA-6 'Acrid'
- A hieroglyph (𓐒) (Gardiner's designated symbol AA6)
- Ace Attorney 6
