= Skyflash =

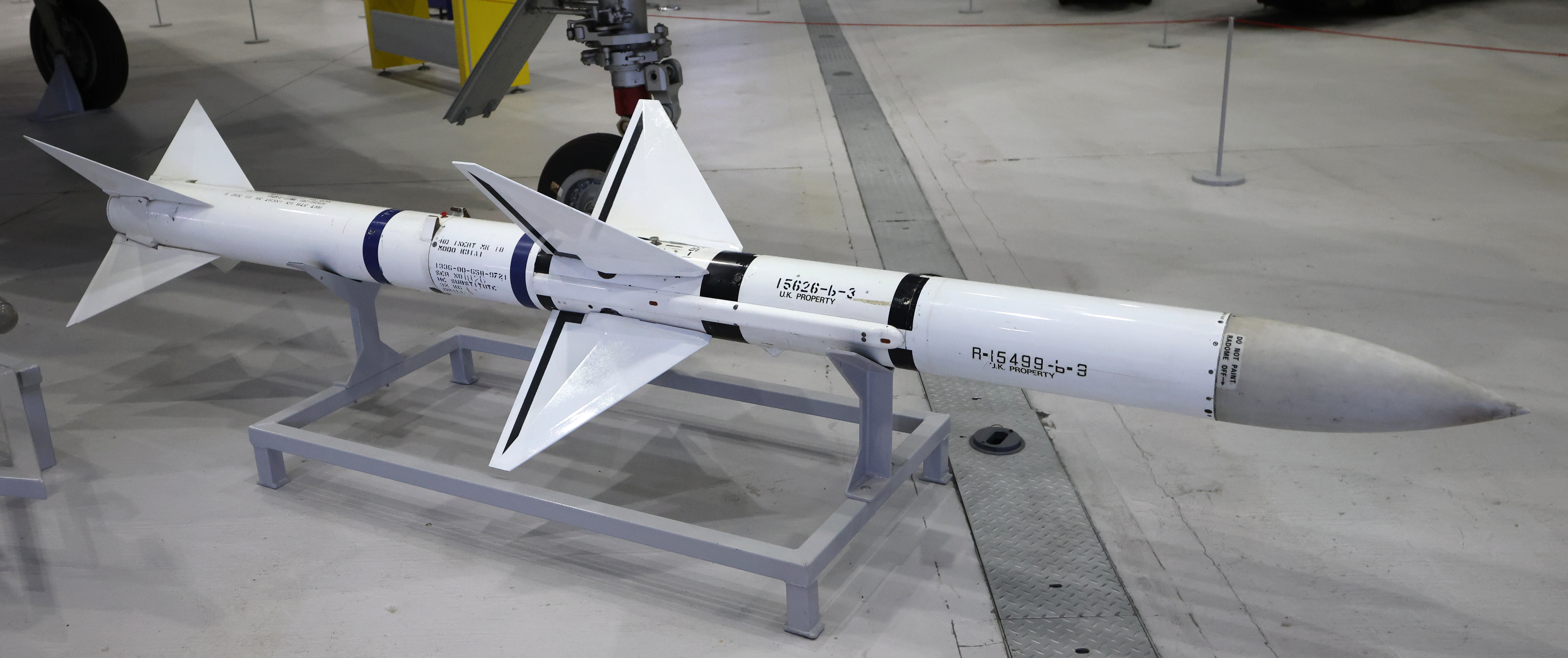
- Skyflash missile at Imperial War Museum Duxford
- Type: Medium-range air-to-air missile
- Place of origin: United Kingdom

Service history
- In service: 1978–2006

Production history
- Designer: Hawker Siddeley, Marconi Space & Defence Systems
- Manufacturer: BAe Dynamics
- Unit cost: £150,000 per missile

Specifications
- Mass: 193 kg (425 lb)
- Length: 3.68 m (12 ft 1 in)
- Diameter: 203 mm
- Wingspan: 1.02 m (3 ft 6 in)
- Warhead: 39.5 kg (87 lb)
- Engine: Rocketdyne solid propellant rocket motor
- Operational range: 45 km (28 mi)
- Maximum speed: Mach 4 (3,069 mph, 4,939 kmh, 2,666 kn)
- Guidance system: Marconi inverse monopulse semi-active radar homing

The Skyflash, or Sky Flash in marketing material, was a medium-range semi-active radar homing air-to-air missile derived from the US AIM-7 Sparrow missile and carried by Royal Air Force McDonnell Douglas F-4 Phantoms and Tornado F3s, Italian Aeronautica Militare and Royal Saudi Air Force Tornados and Swedish Flygvapnet Saab Viggens.

Skyflash replaced the original Raytheon conical scanning seeker with a Marconi inverse monopulse seeker that worked with the F-4's radar. Monopulse seekers are more accurate, less susceptible to jamming, and able to easily pick out targets at low altitudes. It offered significantly better performance than the original seeker, allowing British Aerospace to dispense with upgrades to the warhead that were carried out in the US to address poor accuracy.

Skyflash was tested in the US, but after trials against experimental monopulse seekers from Raytheon, the United States Navy elected to order a different monopulse-equipped version of the Sparrow, the AIM-7M. Both Skyflash and the AIM-7M were later replaced by the more capable AMRAAM.

== History ==
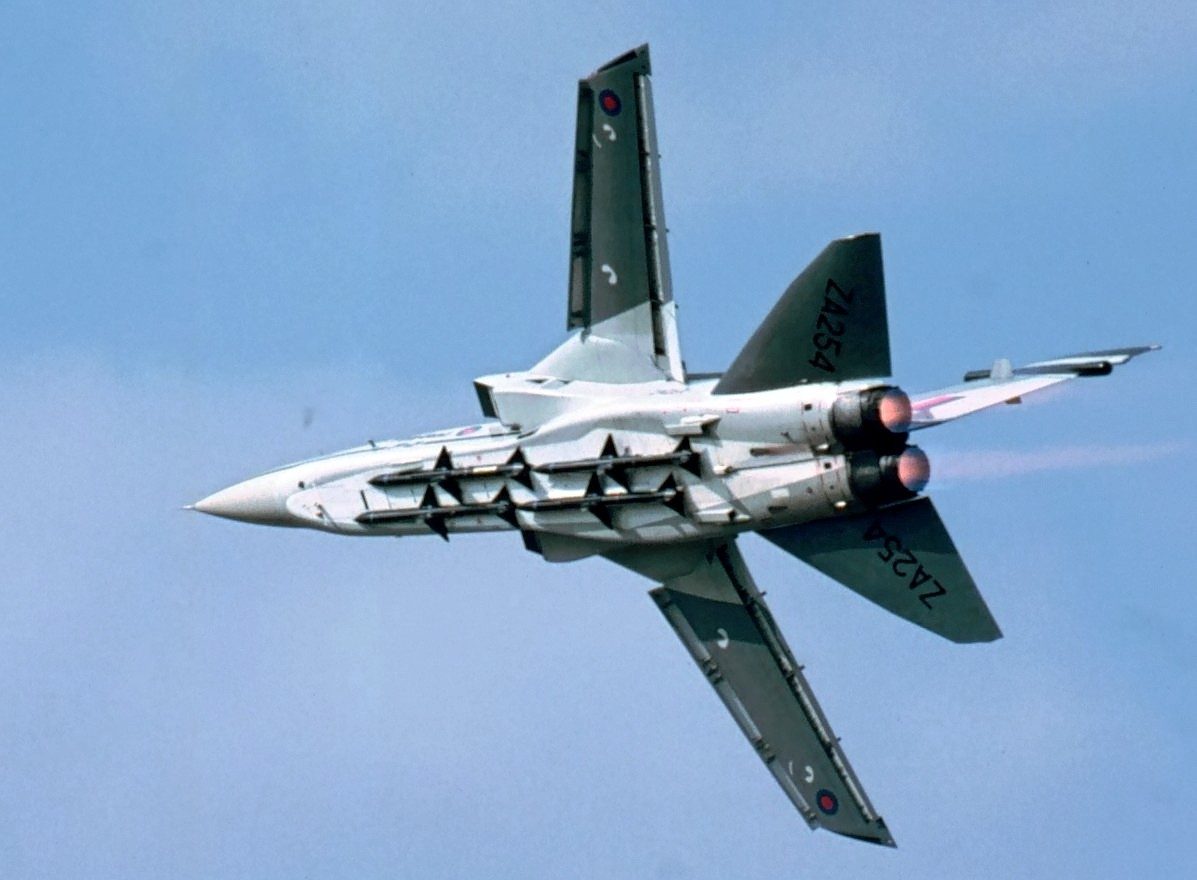
Prototype Panavia Tornado ADV aircraft with semi-recessed Skyflash missiles

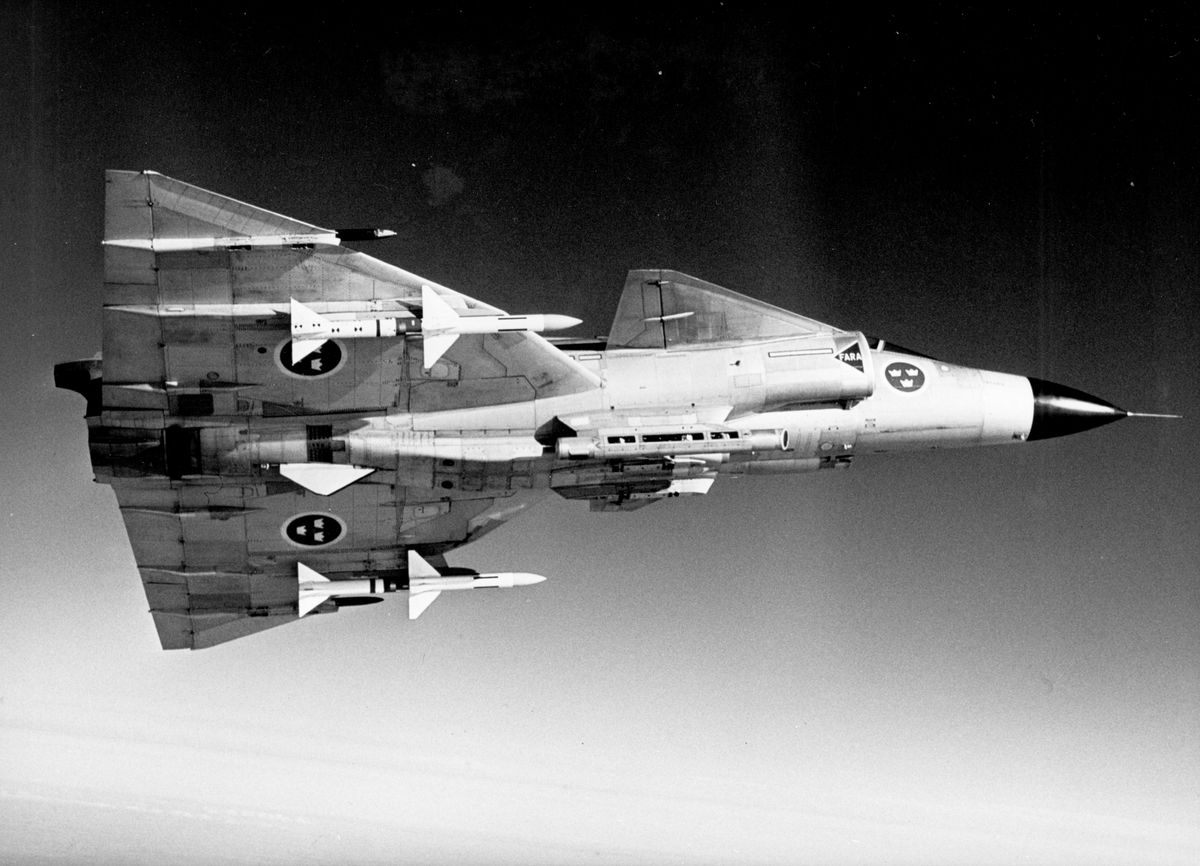
Swedish Air Force JA37 Viggen with a pair of underwing Skyflash missiles

Skyflash came out of a British plan to develop an inverse monopulse seeker for the Sparrow AIM-7E-2 by General Electric Company (GEC) and the Royal Aircraft Establishment (RAE) at the end of the 1960s. Having shown this was feasible, Air Staff Requirement 1219 was issued in January 1972, with the project code XJ.521. The contractors were Hawker Siddeley and Marconi Space & Defence Systems (the renamed GEC guided weapons division) at Stanmore. Major changes from the Sparrow were the addition of a Marconi semi-active inverse monopulse radar seeker, improved electronics, adapted control surfaces and a Thorn EMI active radar fuze. The rocket motors used were the Bristol Aerojet Mk 52 mod 2 and the Rocketdyne Mk 38 mod 4 rocket motor; the latest is the Aerojet Hoopoe.

Tests of the resulting missile showed it could function successfully in hostile electronic countermeasures (ECM) environments and could engage targets under a wide variety of conditions. It could be launched from as low as 100 m to attack a high-altitude target or launched at high level to engage a target flying as low as 75 m. In testing, it repeatedly intercepted target drones at 1,000 ft altitude, the minimum altitude that the tracking cameras could be set to.

The missile entered service on the F-4 Phantom in 1978 as what was later called the 3000 Pre TEMP series (Tornado Embodied Modification Package). In 1985, these aircraft were replaced with the Panavia Tornado ADV. Both the Phantom and the Tornado carried the Skyflash in semi-recessed wells on the aircraft's underbelly to reduce drag. In the Tornado, however, Frazer-Nash hydraulic trapezes projected the missile out into the slipstream prior to motor ignition. This widened the missile's firing envelope by ensuring that the launch was not affected by turbulence from the fuselage. Skyflash was therefore converted to the 5000 TEMP series to incorporate the Frazer-Nash recesses in the body of the missile, Launch Attitude Control electronics in the autopilot section and improved wing surfaces. The Tornado-Skyflash combination became operational in 1987 with the formation of the first Tornado F.3 squadron.

From 1988 a further modification (6000 series) nicknamed "SuperTEMP" included the Hoopoe rocket motor to change the missile's flight profile from boost-and-glide (with a 3-second burn) to boost-sustain-glide (3 second boost - 4 second sustain), increasing its range from 17nm to 18.4nm at a height of 30,000ft and a more substantial increase from 14nm to 16nm at 5,000ft. The maximum flight time was also raised from 40 to 50-60 seconds.

In RAF service the missiles were usually carried in conjunction with four short-range air-to-air missiles, either AIM-9 Sidewinders or ASRAAMs.

A version with an active Thomson CSF-developed radar seeker and inertial mid-course update capability, Skyflash Mk 2 (called Active Skyflash), was proposed for both the RAF and Sweden. British interest ended with the 1981 Defence Review; British Aerospace (BAe) kept the proposal around until the early '90s but there were no buyers.

Further advanced Sky Flash derivatives were studied under the code name S225X, and a ramjet-powered version, the S225XR became the basis for the MBDA Meteor.

In 1996 the RAF announced the launch of the Capability Sustainment Programme which called for, among other things, the replacement of the Skyflash with the AIM-120 AMRAAM. AMRAAM incorporates an active seeker with a strapdown inertial reference unit and computer system, giving it fire-and-forget capability. The first Tornado ADV F.3 with limited AMRAAM capability entered service in 1998. In 2002, a further upgrade enabled full AMRAAM capability. The first mention of AMRAAM as a replacement for Skyflash dates back to 1986.

== Former operators ==
Italy

- Italian Air Force

Saudi Arabia

- Royal Saudi Air Force

Sweden

- Swedish Air Force Made under license as the Rb 71

United Kingdom

- Royal Air Force
