= Scintillation (radar) =

Scintillation is a fluctuation in the amplitude of a target on a radar display. It is closely related to target glint, or wander, an apparent displacement of the target from its mean position. This effect can be caused by a shift of the effective reflection point on the target, but has other causes as well. The fluctuations can be slow (scan-to-scan) or rapid (pulse-to-pulse).

It appears especially at seaside level.

Scintillation and glint are actually two manifestations of the same phenomenon and are most properly linked to one another in target modeling.
