= HQ-6 =

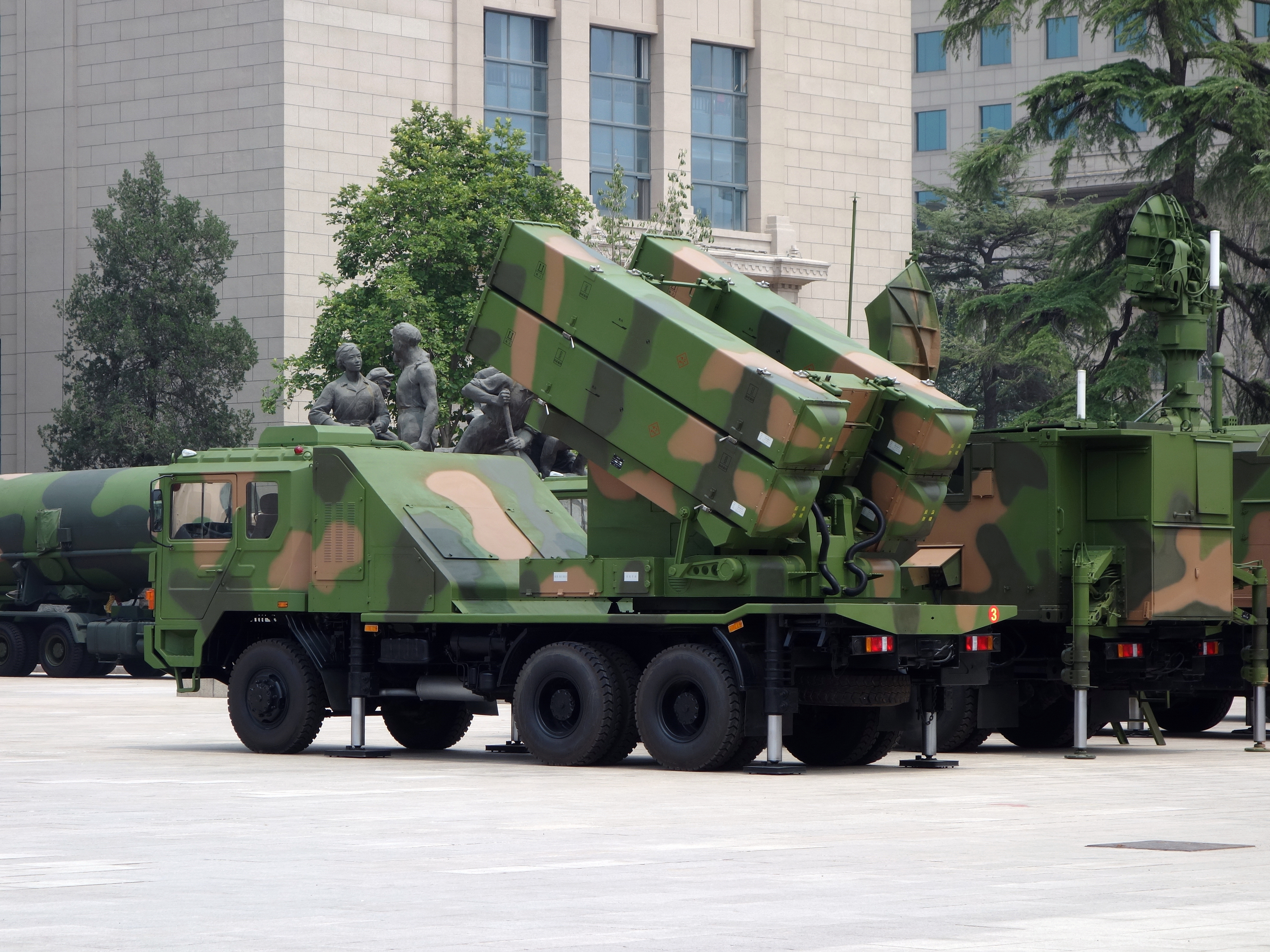
- HQ-6A Surface-to-air missiles mounted with road-mobile launcher
- Type: air-to-air & surface-to-air missiles
- Place of origin: China

Service history
- In service: late 1980s – present
- Used by: Primary user: China; See Operators section for others

Production history
- Manufacturer: Shanghai Academy of Spaceflight Technology
- Produced: since late 1980s

Specifications
- Mass: 220 kg
- Length: 3.69 meter
- Diameter: 203 mm
- Warhead: 33 kg warhead
- Detonation mechanism: impact / proximity
- Engine: rocket motor
- Propellant: solid fuel
- Operational range: 18 km for SAM, 60 km for AAM
- Maximum speed: Mach 3
- Guidance system: SARH / ARH
- Launch platform: Air & surface

The HQ-6, also known as LY-60 (NATO reporting name: CH-SA-6), is a family of Chinese air defense missiles developed by the Shanghai Academy of Spaceflight Technology (SAST), a subsidery of China Aerospace Science and Technology Corporation (CASC). The missile is largely based on the Chinese PL-11 and Italian Selenia (now as Leonardo S.p.A.) Aspide missile.

== Development ==
HQ-6 is a surface-to-air missile system developed by the Shanghai Academy of Science and Technology, incorporating technologies from PL-11 missile. PL-11 is the license-produced version of Aspide missile, which itself is based on the American AIM-7 Sparrow missile. It was speculated the missile is a copy of AIM-7 when the system was revealed in the late 1970s, though HQ-6 is considerably larger than the AIM-7 Sparrow. HQ-6 missile went through multiple iterations, and an export variant named LY-60 was also developed.

== Variants ==
=== PL-11 ===
The PL-11 (Chinese: 霹雳-11; pinyin: Pī Lì-11; lit. 'Thunderbolt-11') is a medium-range semi-active radar homing (SARH) air-to-air missile (AAM) developed by a subsidiary of the Shanghai Academy of Spaceflight Technology in the People's Republic of China. It is a derivate or copy of the Italian Aspide air-to-air missile, which in turn was developed from the American AIM-7 Sparrow. PL-11 is not officially a part of the HQ-6 surface-to-air missile family, but it serves as the technology base for the HQ-6.

=== HQ-61 ===
HQ-61 launcher rail on the decommissioned Type 053K frigate at Qingdao Naval Museum

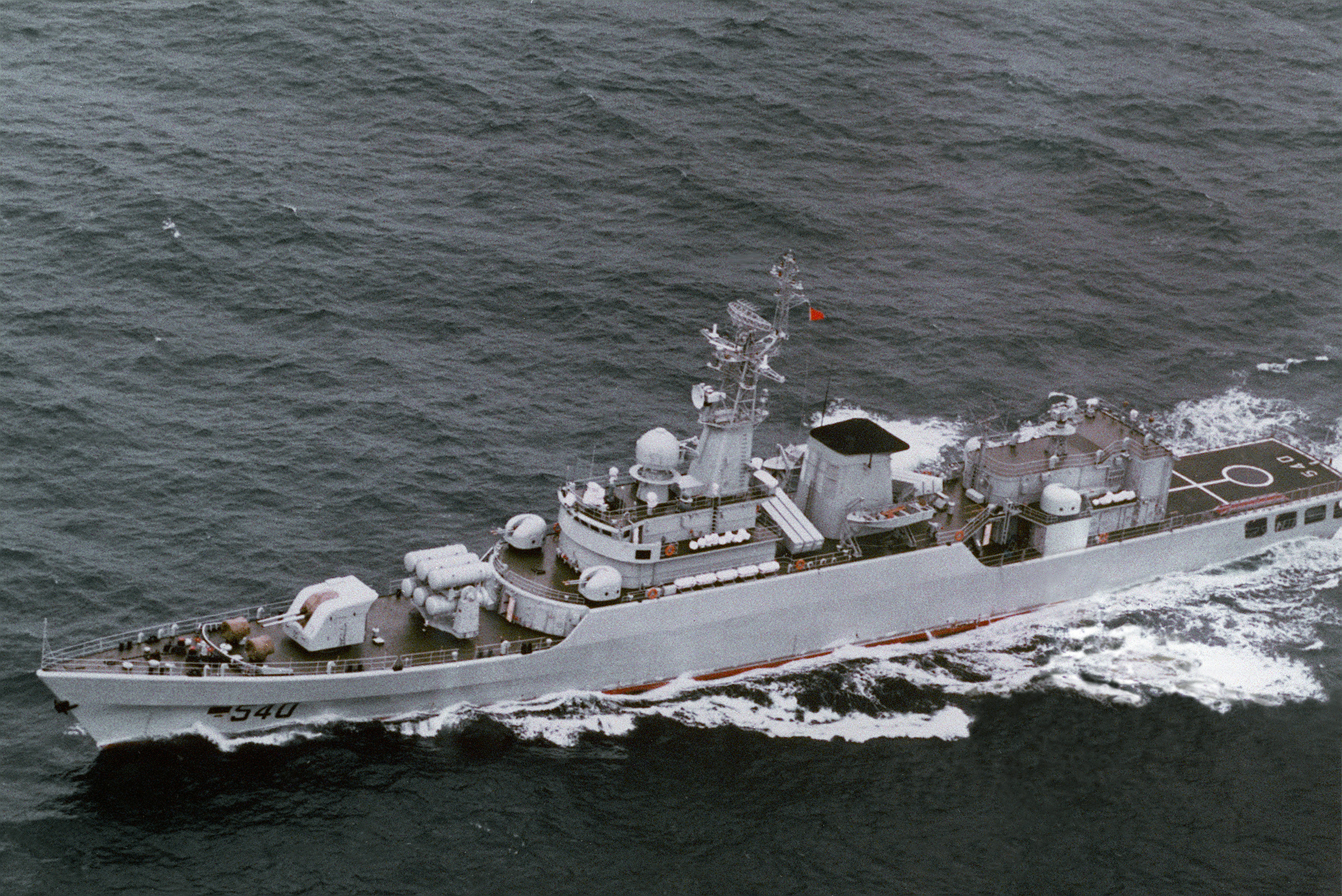
Tube-shaped HQ-61 launcher can be seen on the Type 053H2G frigate, just behind the main gun turret

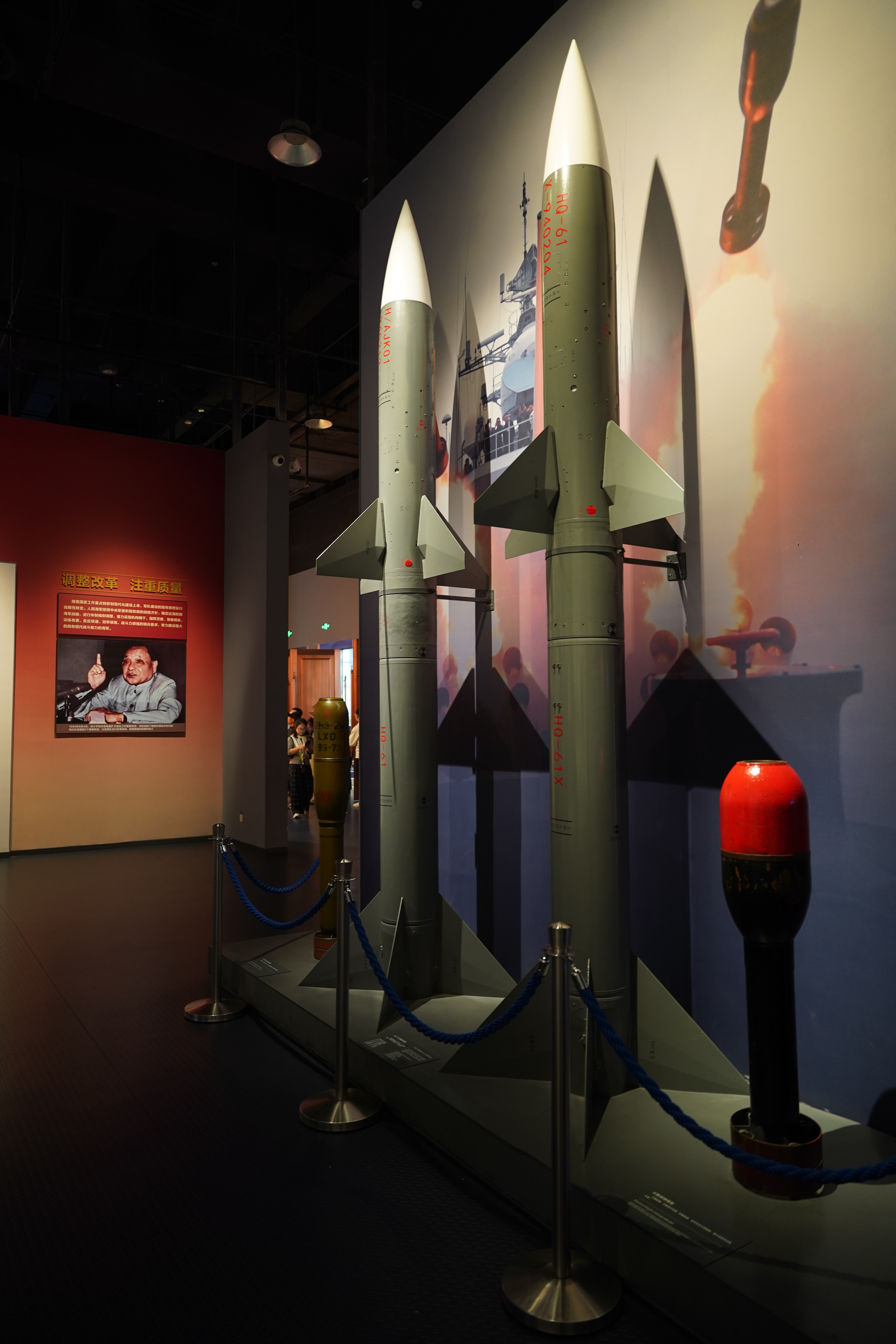
HQ-61 missiles on display at the PLA Naval Museum in Qingdao.

The HQ-61 (simplified Chinese: 红旗-61; traditional Chinese: 紅旗-61; pinyin: Hóng Qí-61; lit. 'Red Banner-61') is the first member of the HQ-6 missile family. The entire SAM system consists of four truck-mounted radars (one search/surveillance radar and three tracking/fire control radars), one power supply truck, and six transporter erector launchers (TEL). The missile itself is directly derived from the air-to-air version PL-11. But unlike the Italian Aspide which uses containers as launchers, HQ-6 uses missile launching rails (MLR) instead, and each truck-mounted launcher has two missile rails. Specifications:

- Length: 3.99 m
- Diameter: 286 mm
- Wingspan: 1 m
- Weight: 300 kg
- Speed: Mach 3
- Maximum maneuvering overload: 35G
- Maximum maneuvering overload [interception]: 7G
- Range: 30m to 8 km (altitude), 10 m to 10 km (slant)
- Guidance: Semi-Active Radar Homing

The HQ-61 was deployed on Type 053H2G frigate Jiangwei I frigate of the People's Liberation Army Navy Surface Force. The HQ-61 was equipped on four Type 053H2G built between 1988 and 1991. The capability of the missile was questioned by the Chinese Navy, and the missile system was eventually replaced by the HQ-7 air defense system.

=== LY-60 ===
In October 1994, China unveils a new medium-low-altitude surface-to-air missile system named LY-60 (Chinese: 猎鹰-60; pinyin: Lieying-60; lit. 'Falcon-60'). LY-60 was designed to intercept military aircraft and missiles flying in medium to low altitudes. To improve anti-jamming capability, the command control system features a unique artificial interference system due to its improved microprocessor, never seen before in contemporary medium-low-altitude air defense missiles. The search radar of the LY-60 can track up to 40 targets simultaneously, and the tracking radar is able to simultaneously track 12 targets, and engage three targets at once.

=== YJ-5 ===
YJ-5 (Chinese: 鹰击5号) Anti-radiation missile was developed based on the airframe of HQ-61. The development began in 1980. Prototypes were completed in 1984 and test-fired on the H-5 bomber. The missile was certified in the early 1990s but never began serial production due to insufficient capability against advanced phased array radars. The Chinese military decided to import Kh-31 instead.

=== HQ-64 ===
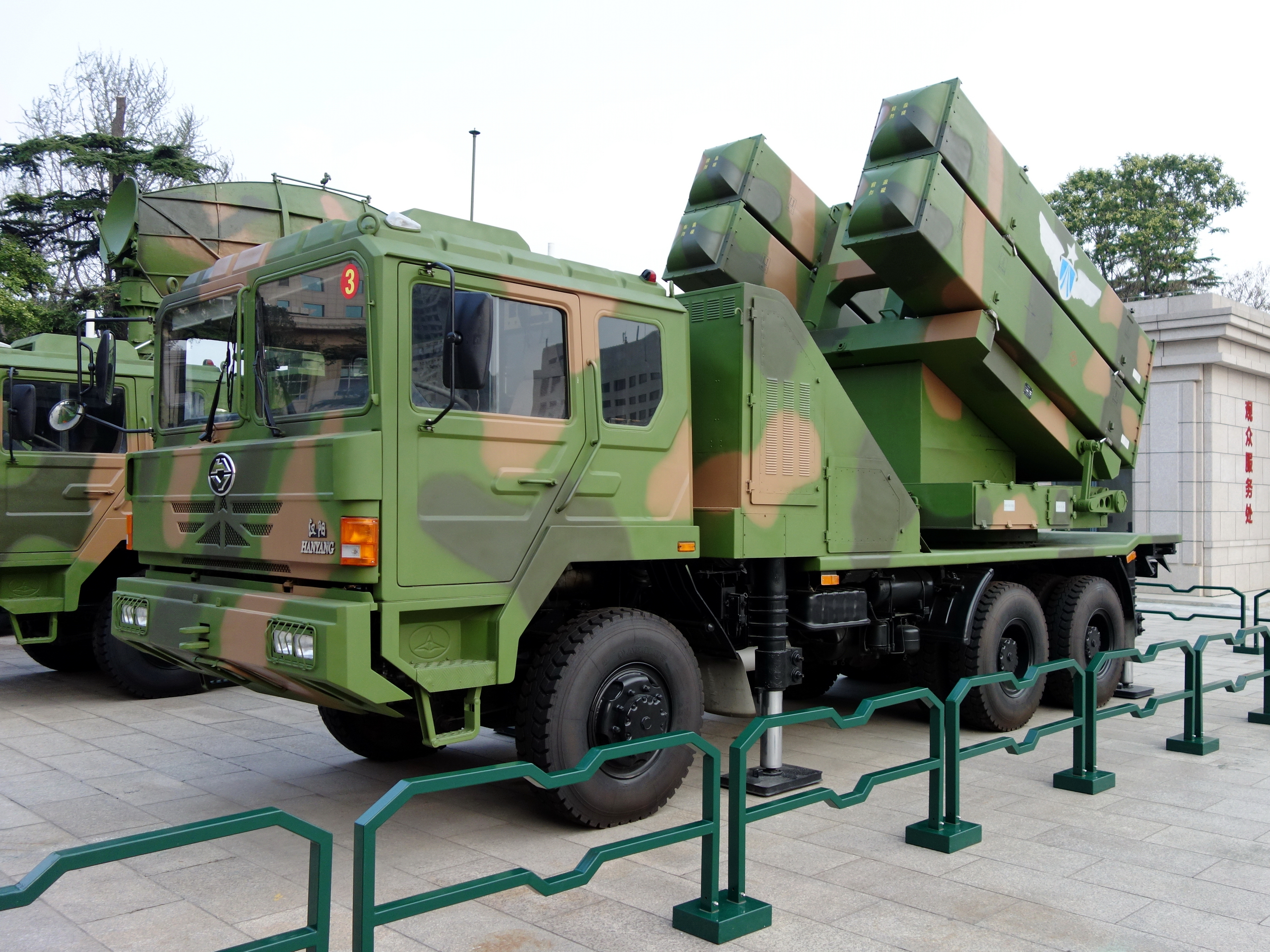
HQ-64 missile launcher vehicle, part of the HQ-6A gun-missile air defense system

The HQ-64 is an improved version of the HQ-61, incorporating experience and technologies gained from the LY-60 project. When paired with a command vehicle, the system is called HQ-6D air defense system. The firepower is doubled by increasing the number of missiles for each truck mounted launcher from two to four, and by replacing the launching rails with container box launchers, the reliability is also increased. Both the missile and transporter vehicles are directly developed from the LY-60 system. The missile is smaller than that of the HQ-6, yet the performance is enhanced due to technological improvements. HQ-64 passed the state certification test and was accepted into Chinese service in 2001.

Each command vehicle is able to command & control up to four HQ-64 batteries, linking up independent HQ-64 batteries to form an integrated air defense net work, and individual HQ-64 network can in turn be integrated into a larger air defense zone. The field deployment time of HQ-64 SAM system is 9 to 15 minutes. Specifications:

- Length: 3.89 m
- Diameter: 203 mm
- Weight: 220 kg
- Speed: Mach 3
- Range: 30m to 12 km (altitude), 10 m to 18 km (slant)
- Guidance: Semi-Active Radar Homing

=== HQ-6A ===
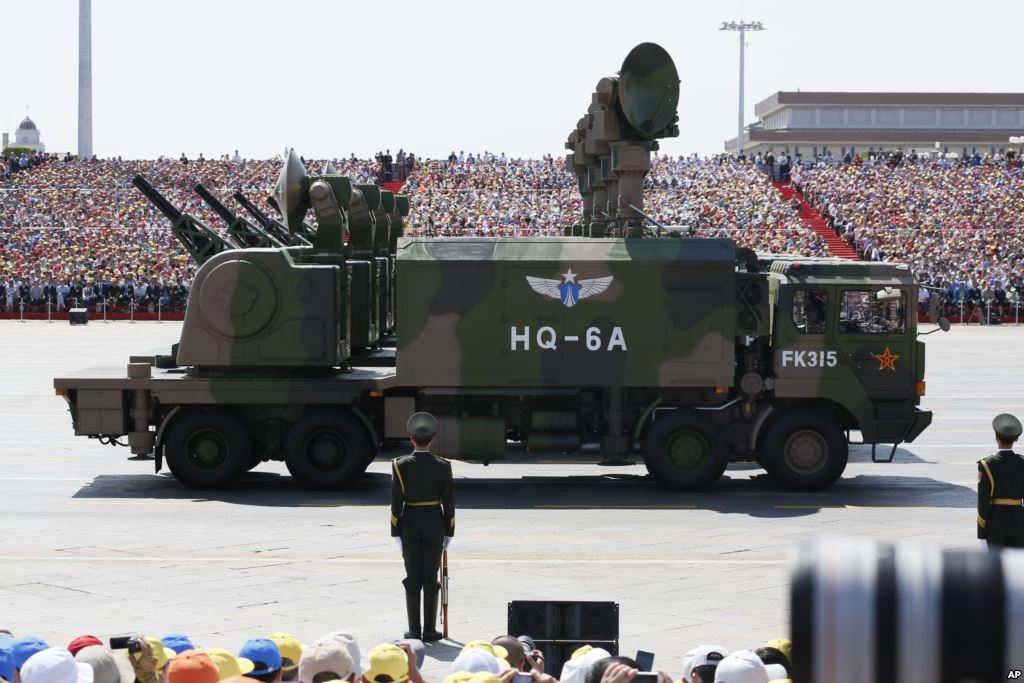
LD-2000 CIWS as part of the HQ-6A system

HQ-6A is a gun-missile air defense system combining a HQ-64 missile launcher with a LD-2000 close-in weapon system.

== Operators ==
=== Current operators ===
- China
- Ethiopia
- Morocco
- Sudan
- Pakistan

== See also ==
- List of missiles
- PL-11
- HQ-11
