= Semi-active guidance =

Semi-active guidance can refer to:

- Semi-active radar homing
- Semi-active laser guidance
