= Aspide =

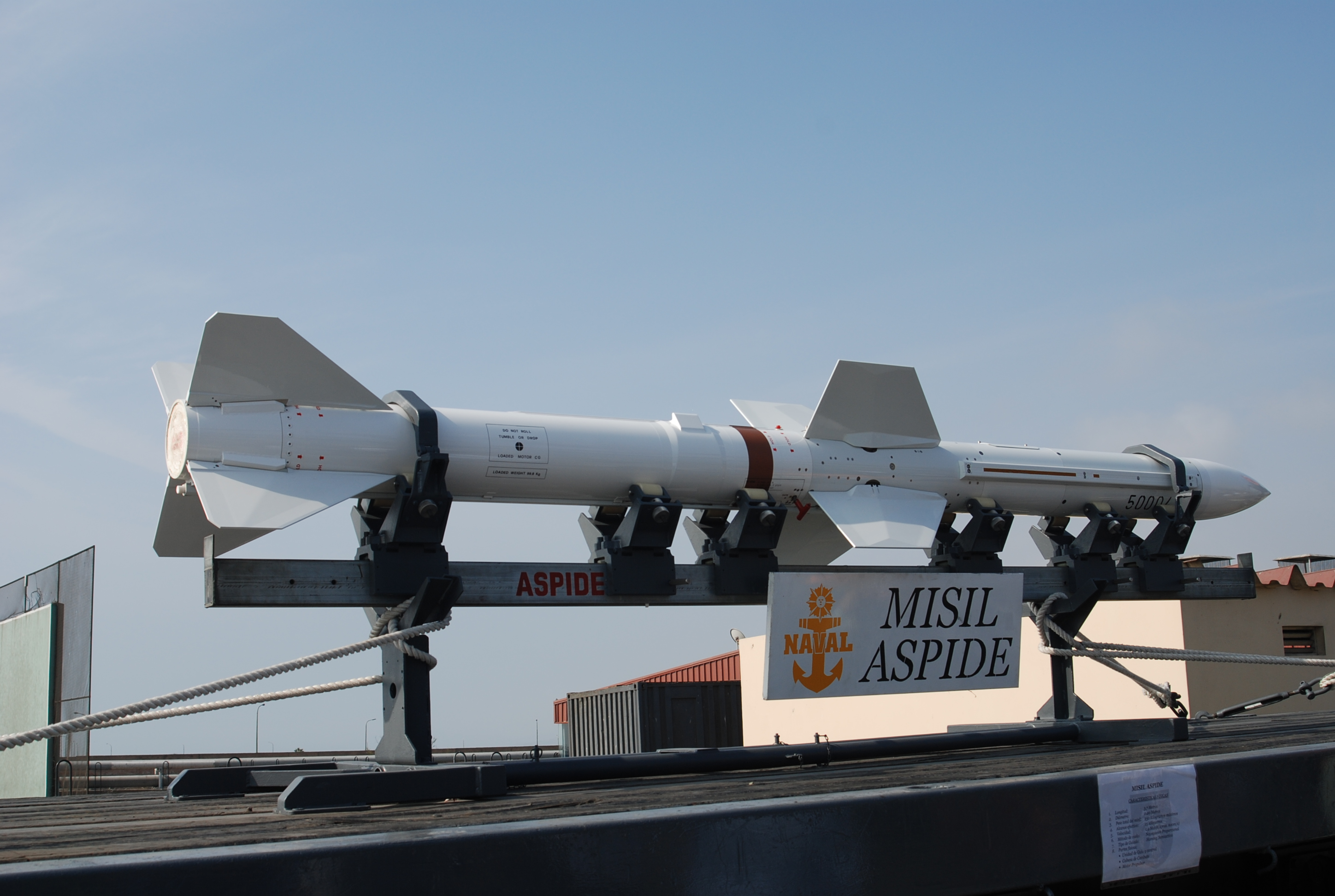
- Type: Medium range Surface to air missile/ Air to air missile
- Place of origin: Italy

Service history
- In service: 1977-present
- Wars: Russo-Ukrainian War

Production history
- Manufacturer: Selenia (former), MBDA Italy
- Produced: 1973-present

Specifications
- Mass: Aspide Mk. 1: 220 kg (490 lb); Aspide 2000: 240 kg (530 lb)
- Length: 3.7 m (12 ft)
- Diameter: Aspide Mk. 1: 203 mm (8.0 in); Aspide 2000: 234 mm (9.2 in)
- Wingspan: Surface to air: 80 cm (31 in); Air to air: 100 cm (39 in)
- Effective firing range: Aspide Mk. 1: 15 km (9.3 mi) for surface to air 40 km (25 mi) for air to air; Aspide 2000: > 25 km (16 mi) for surface to air
- Warhead: 35 kg (77 lb)
- Maximum speed: Mach 5
- Guidance system: semi-active radar homing

Aspide, named for the asp, is an Italian medium range air-to-air and surface-to-air missile produced by Selenia and its successors, Alenia Aeronautica and MBDA that was developed in the 1970s to replace license built AIM-7 Sparrows then in use on Italian Air Force F-104S Starfighter interceptors. It is similar in appearance to the Sparrow, with original versions sharing an airframe with the type and all using a similar semi-active radar homing seeker. This similarity in appearance combined with Selenia's license production of Sparrows has led to non-Italian press frequently referring to the missile as a Sparrow variant.

Compared to Sparrow, Aspide features an inverse monopulse seeker that is far more accurate and much less susceptible to ECM. Aspide also features new electronics, a new warhead, and a new, more powerful engine. Closed-loop hydraulics were also substituted for Sparrow's open-loop type, which gave Aspide better downrange maneuverability. Surface to air versions of the missile further altered this, replacing the original triangular wings with a newly designed cropped delta version in order to reduce the size of launch canisters.

A similar design is the UK's Skyflash, which entered service about the same time. The US's own Sparrow fleet also added an inverse monopulse seeker with AIM-7M in 1982.

== Design ==
Aspide in its various versions was used both in the air-to-air role, carried by Aeritalia F-104s after the ASA upgrade, and in the surface-to-air role from both ground based and shipboard installations. In the former role it has been replaced by AIM-120 AMRAAM and MBDA Meteor, in the latter role it has been replaced by the MBDA Aster. Naval Aspide launchers can be adapted to fire the Sea Sparrow by merely switching a single circuit board.

In the mid 1980s, China imported a small batch of the Aspide Mk. 1 from Italy, then signed an agreement with Alenia to produce the missile locally under license. In 1989, China produced its first batch of Aspide Mk. 1 missiles using imported parts from Italy. However, due to the EEC arms embargo imposed after the 1989 Tiananmen Square protests and massacre, China was unable to purchase additional Aspide kits. China subsequently developed its own missile family based on the Aspide Mk. 1, with surface to air versions designated HQ-6, and an air-to-air version designated PL-11.

The rocket engine of the Aspide is currently produced by Turkish missile manufacturer Roketsan. It weighs about 75 kg and produces 50 kN of thrust for 3.5 s.

== Variants ==
- Aspide Mk. 1 – Similar to AIM-7E, with Selenia monopulse semi-active seeker and SNIA-Viscosa solid-propellant rocket motor. This version was popular with export customers, and sold to 17 countries. The surface-to-air systems are Skyguard and Spada.
- Aspide Mk. 2 – Improved version with active radar-homing seeker. Development was shelved in favor of better missiles, such as the AIM-120 AMRAAM.
- Aspide 2000 – Improved surface-to-air version of the Aspide Mk.1 featuring a 40% improvement in range, used on export Skyguard and Spada 2000 air-defense systems.
- Aspide CITEDEF – Surface-to-air version of the Aspide Mk.1 upgraded by CITEDEF of Argentina.

== Systems ==
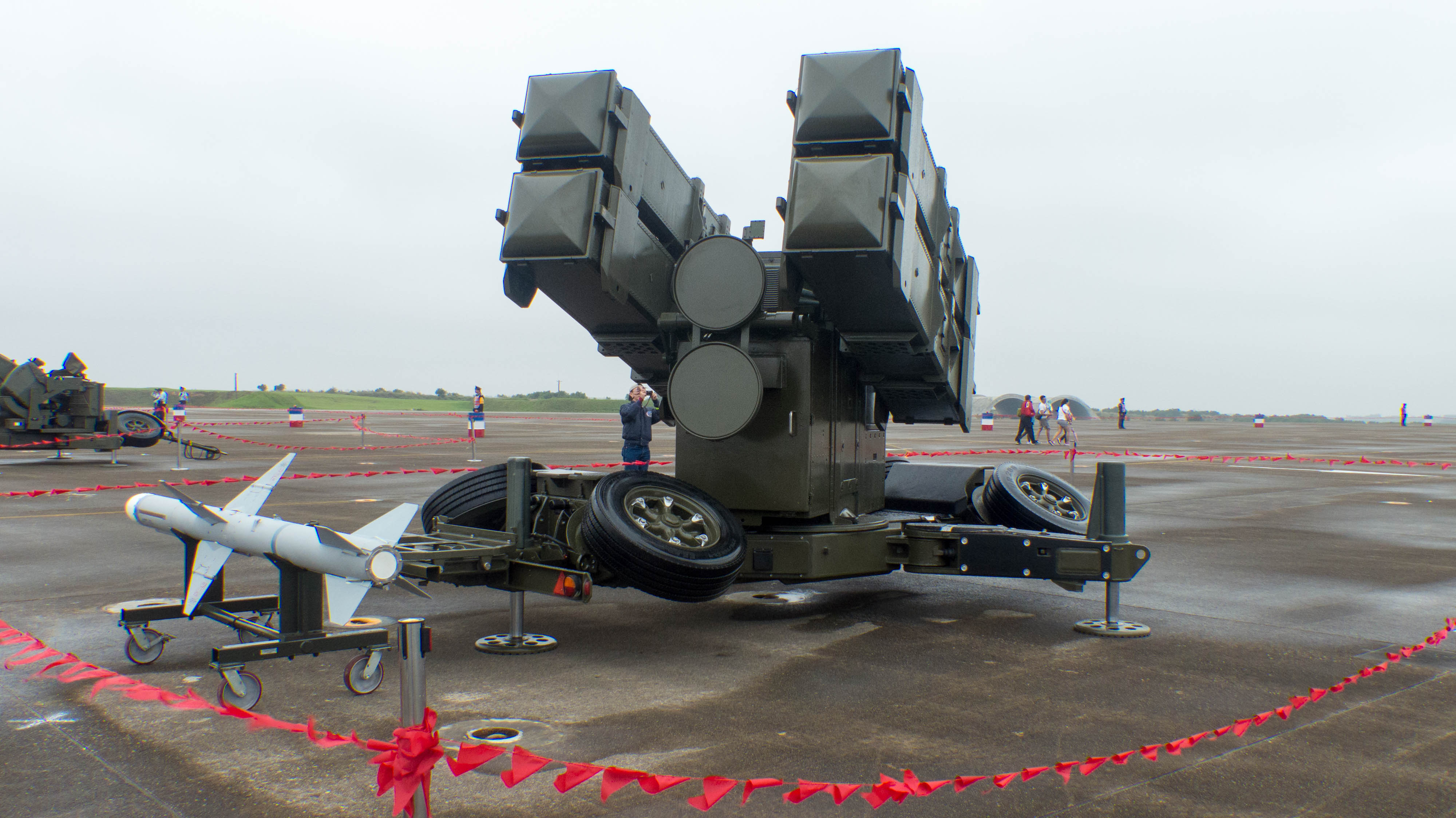
Four-tube Aspide/Sparrow launcher with Sparrow missile

- Skyguard I – Surface to air missile complex from Oerlikon Contraves, supports Sparrow, Aspide, and Skyflash.
- Skyguard II – Improved version of Skyguard with added electro-optical tracking and support for Aspide 2000.
- Toledo – Skyguard with Skydor fire control system from Navantia.
- Spada – Surface to air missile complex from Selenia for the Italian Air Force with Selenia PLUTO 2D radar.
- Spada 2000 – Improved version of Spada with Thomson-CSF RAC 3D radar and support for Aspide 2000.
- Albatros Mk. 2 – Naval surface to air missile complex from Selenia developed for the Italian Navy, upgradeable to support Aspide 2000.

== Operators ==
=== Current operators ===
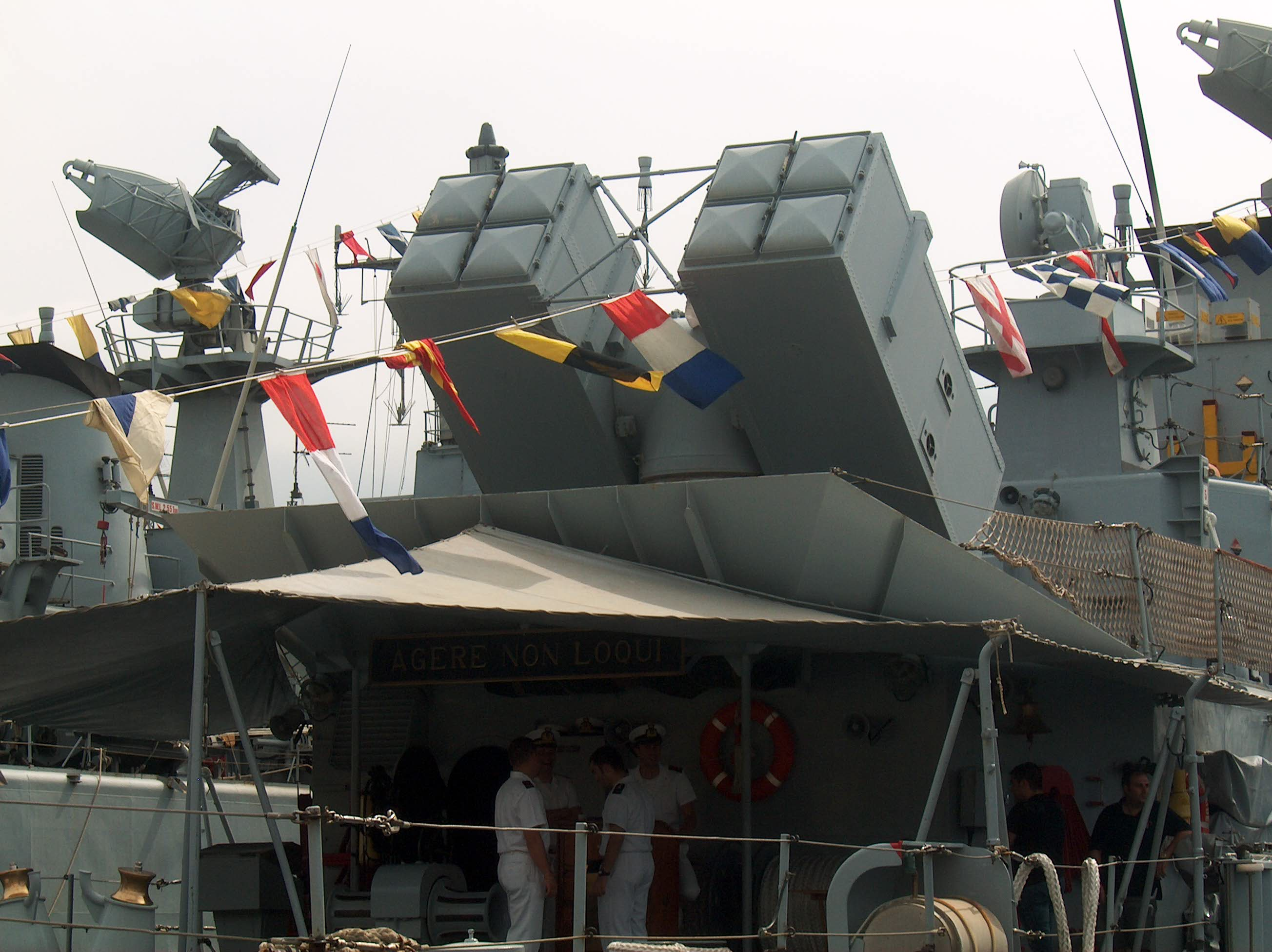
Albatros Mk.2 air defense system Mk.29 Aspide/Sparrow launcher

Argentina
- 150 Aspide Mk. 1 for Almirante Brown class frigates; ordered in 1979 and delivered in 1983–1984.
Brazil
- 100 Aspide 2000 for aircraft carrier São Paulo and Niterói-class frigates; ordered in 1996 and delivered in 2001–2004.
China
- 90 Aspide Mk. 1 ordered in 1986 and delivered in 1987–1991. Technology used in development of PL-11.

ASPIDE missile launcher of the Cyprus National Guard

Cyprus
- 130 ordered in 1991 and delivered in 1991-1992 as part of a $114 m deal including 12 Skyguard launchers.
Ecuador
- 50 ordered in 1979 and delivered in 1982–1984 for Esmeraldas-class corvettes.
Egypt
- 72 ordered in 1983 and delivered in 1984 for Abu Qir-class corvettes.

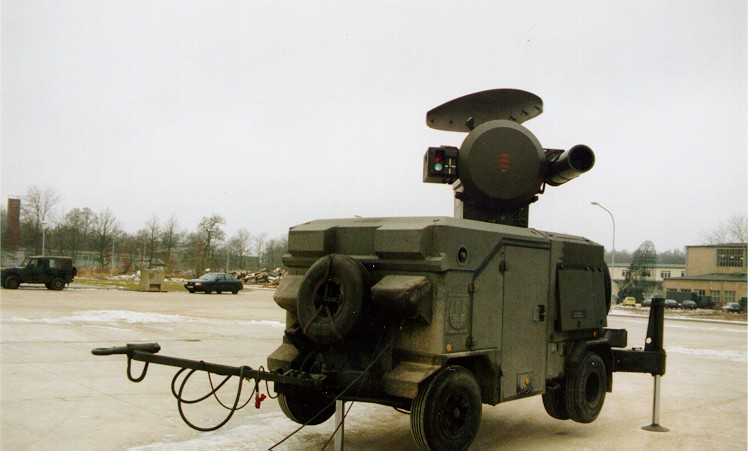
Skyguard II cabin with radar & optics

Greece
- 75 for Elli-class frigates; ordered in 1980 and delivered in 1981–1988.

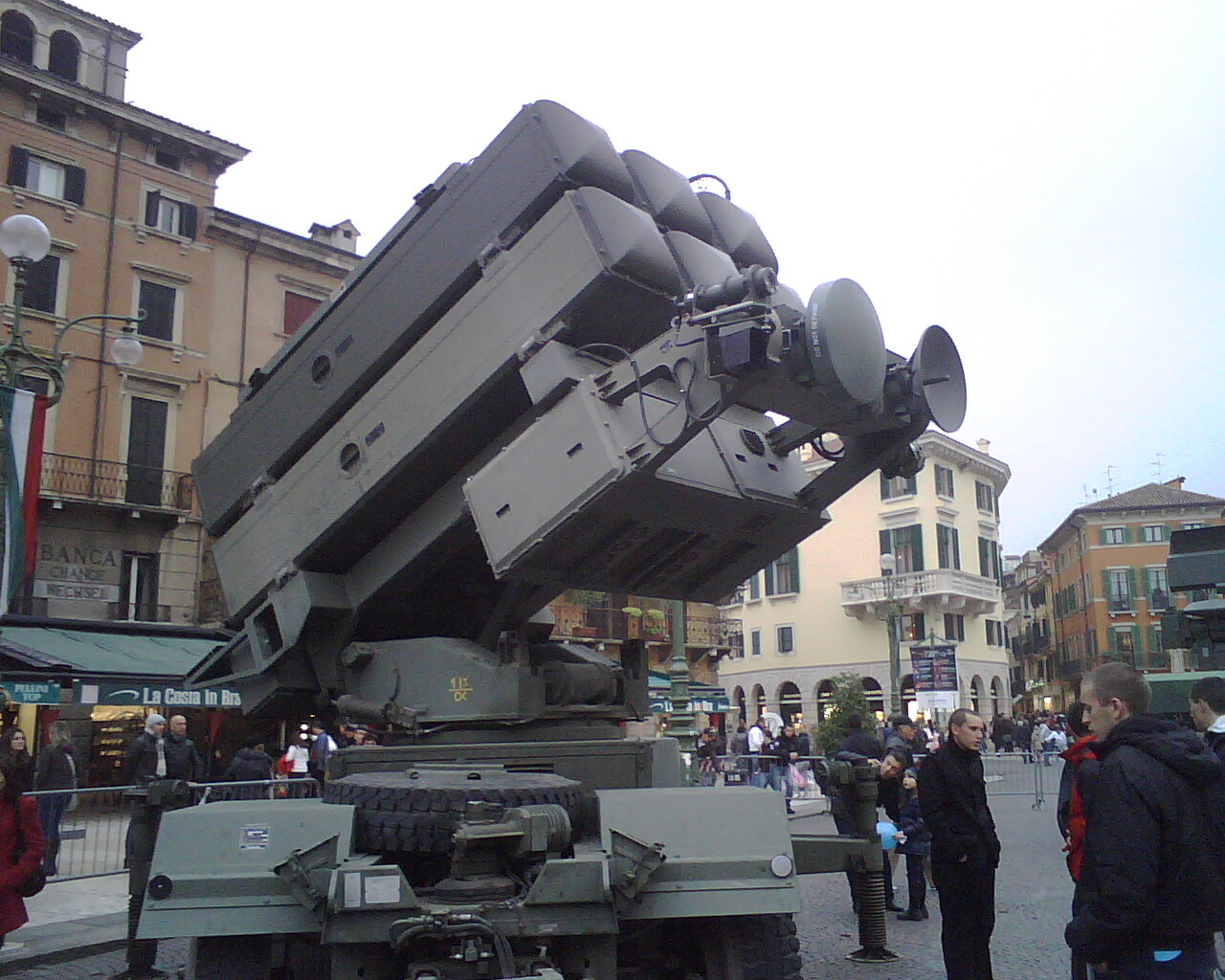
Six-tube Aspide launcher

Italy
- used on-board F-104S along with 7 Spada SAM batteries, 24 Skyguard SAM batteries, and 32 naval Albatros Mk. 2 SAM systems.
Kuwait

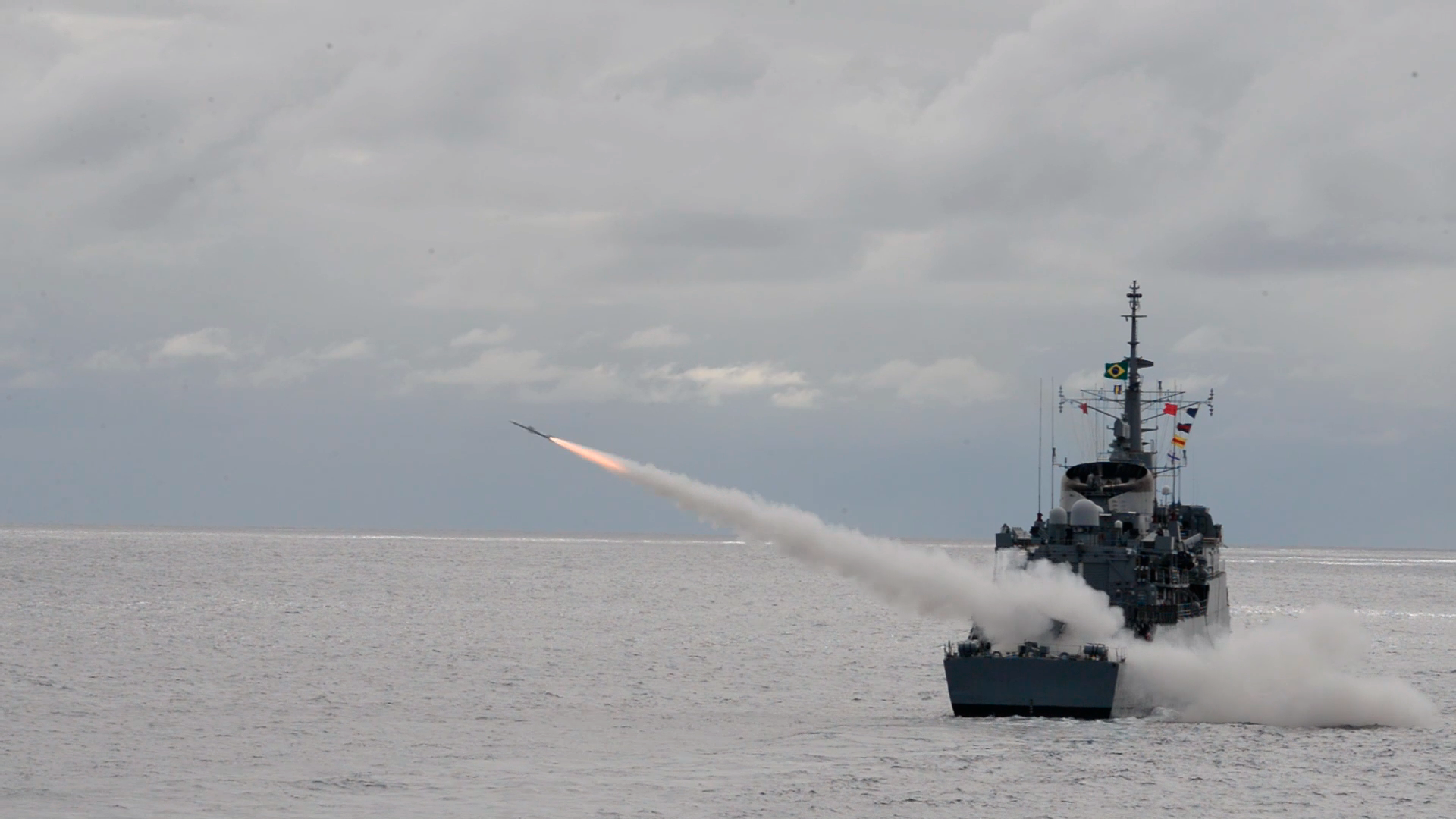
Aspide fired by the Brazilian frigate Defensora

- 320 Aspide Mk. 1 ordered in 1988 and delivered in 1988–1997 for Skyguard Amoun SAM System; 175 Aspide 2000 ordered in 2007 and delivered in 2008–2010 part of $565m deal; 250 Aspide 2000 ordered in 2007 and delivered in 2008–2013 as part of a $65 m deal for Skyguard air defense systems.
Libya
- 8 ordered in 1978 and delivered in 1983 for use on Albatros Mk. 2 SAM on modernised Libyan frigate Dat Assawari.
Morocco
- 40 ordered in 1977 and delivered in 1983 for corvette Lieutenant Colonel Errhamani.
Nigeria
- 25 Aspide Mk. 1 ordered in 1977 and delivered in 1982 for Nigerian frigate Aradu; other 10 Aspide Mk. 1 ordered in 1982 and delivered in 1983.

Pakistan
- 750 Aspide 2000 for 10 Spada 2000 batteries ordered in 2007 and delivered in 2010-2013 part of 415 m Euro deal.
Peru
- 150 ordered in 1974 and delivered in 1979–87 for use on Carvajal-class frigates.
Spain
- 200 ordered in 1985 and delivered in 1987–89 part of $230 m deal for 13 Skyguard systems, later upgraded to Skydor, with the missiles retired in 2020; 51 Aspide 2000 ordered in 1996 and delivered in 1997–99 for 2 Spada 2000 SAM systems.
Thailand
– 24 ordered in 1984 and delivered in 1986–1987 for use on Ratanakosin-class corvettes; 75 ordered in 1986 and delivered in 1988 for use by Royal Thai Army on 1 Spada SAM system.
Turkey
- 144 ordered in 1986 and delivered in 1987–1989 for Yavuz-class frigates; 72 ordered in 1990 and delivered in 1995–1996 for Barbaros-class frigates.
Venezuela
- 100 ordered in 1975 and delivered in 1980–1982 for use with Albatros Mk. 2 SAM system on Lupo-class frigates.
Ukraine
- Spain will train and donate Aspide 2000 missile systems to Ukraine, with Ukrainian soldiers having finished training on 14 October 2022. Shortly after, then Ukrainian Defence Minister Oleksiy Reznikov announced that Ukraine had received the first NASAMS system from the US, along with the Italian made Aspide.

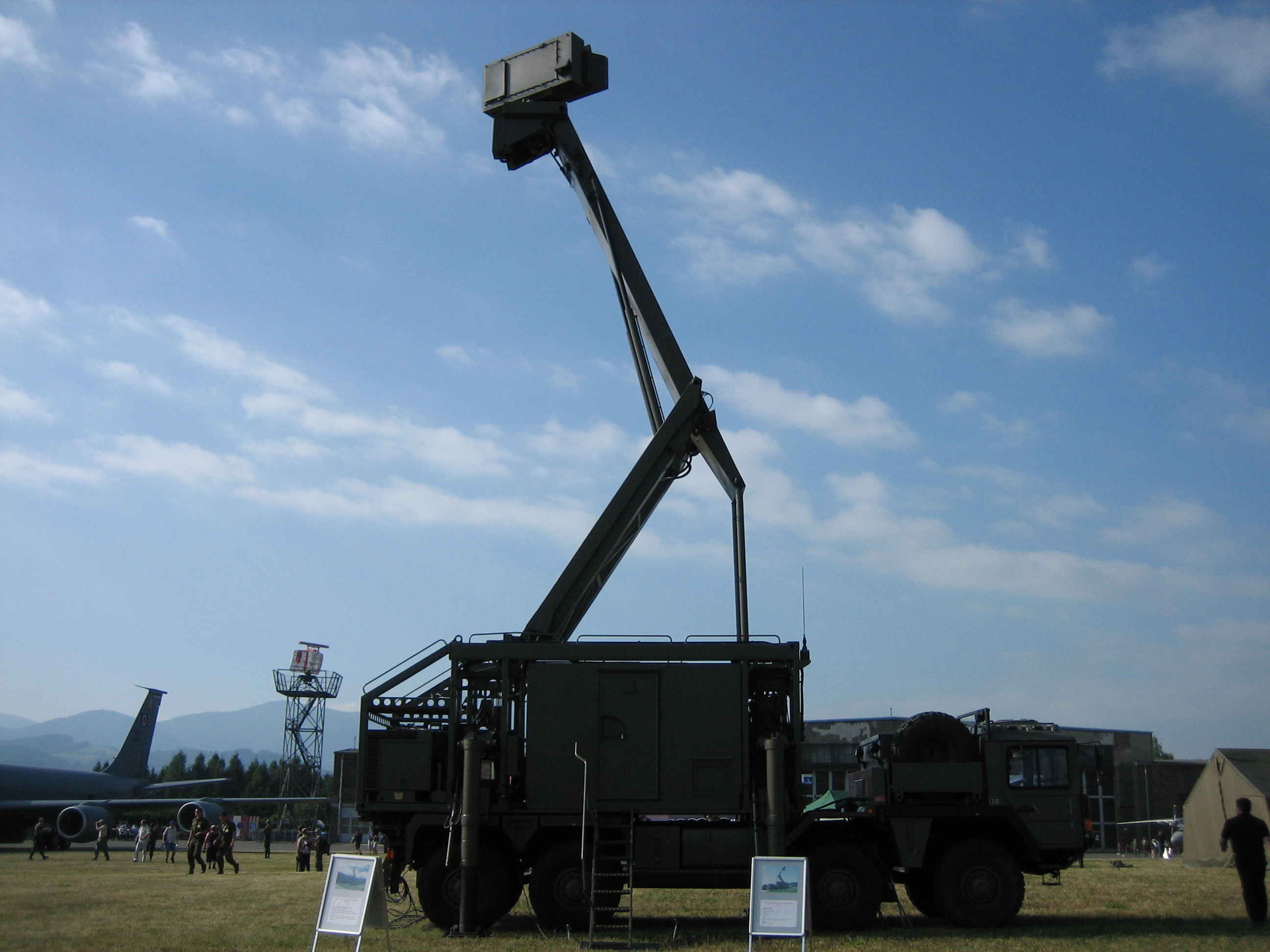
Spada 2000 RAC 3D radar

=== Former operators ===
Malaysia
- 18 ordered in 1995 and delivered in 1997 for Laksamana-class corvettes.
