= Sparoair =

Air-launched sounding rocket developed by the United States Navy between 1950 and 1960

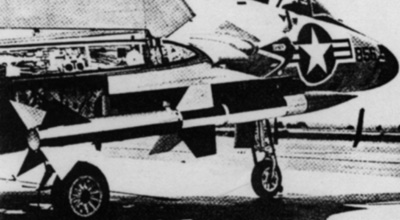
- Sparoair II on F4D
- Function: Sounding rocket
- Manufacturer: Naval Missile Center
- Country of origin: United States

Size
- Height: 3.68 m (12 ft 1 in)
- Diameter: 200 mm (8 in)
- Mass: 143 kg (315 lb)
- Stages: Two

Capacity

Payload to 120 km (65 nmi)
- Mass: 18 kg (40 lb)

Launch history
- Status: Retired
- Launch sites: Point Mugu
- Total launches: >14
- First flight: 1960
- Last flight: 26 May 1966

Sparoair was a family of air-launched sounding rockets developed by the United States Navy in the late 1950s and early 1960s. Based on the Sparrow air-to-air missile, three versions of the rocket were developed; all launches were from Point Mugu and although some were successful, the system did not enter operational service.

== Versions ==
=== Sparoair I and II ===
Sparoair was developed by the Naval Missile Center, as a two-stage development of the Sparrow III air-to-air missile. Propelled by two Sparrow rocket motors mounted in tandem, the Sparoair could be launched from F3H (F-3) Demon and F4D (F-6) Skyray fighter aircraft, and was capable of lifting a 40 pounds (18 kg) payload to an apogee of 65 nautical miles (120 km; 75 mi).

The Sparoair I was the original version of the rocket, launched using an ejection system and a lanyard for firing; after that proved unreliable in flight testing, the Sparoair II was developed that utilised a rail launch with ignition prior to release from the aircraft. Eight launches of Sparoair II vehicles had been conducted by 1961. Each Sparoair II rocket cost US$6,000.

=== Sparoair III ===
Sparoair III utilised a redesigned second-stage motor, and could be launched from the F-4 Phantom II; however, any aircraft capable of launching the Sparrow III AAM could launch the Sparoair.

The Sparoair III utilised the aircraft's Low Altitude Bombing System (LABS) circuits to initiate launch; the second stage was ignited via a mechanical device armed by the acceleration of the first stage.

The first Sparoair III was launched on 8 July 1965; it proved a partial failure as the second stage failed to ignite. The second launch on 26 May 1966 failed after six seconds of second-stage burn when the vehicle exploded. No further launches were undertaken.

=== Version table ===
The following table summarizes the different configurations:

Version	Aircraft	Stage 1	Stage 2	First Launch	Last Launch	Number
Sparoair I	F3H (F-3) Demon, F4D (F-6) Skyray	Sparrow	Sparrow	1960	1964-01-18	4
Sparoair II	F3H (F-3) Demon, F4D (F-6) Skyray	Sparrow	Sparrow	1961	1961	>8
Sparoair III	F-4 Phantom II	Sparrow	22.6KS1245	1965-07-08	1966-05-26	2
