= AIM-7 Sparrow =

American medium-range air-to-air missile

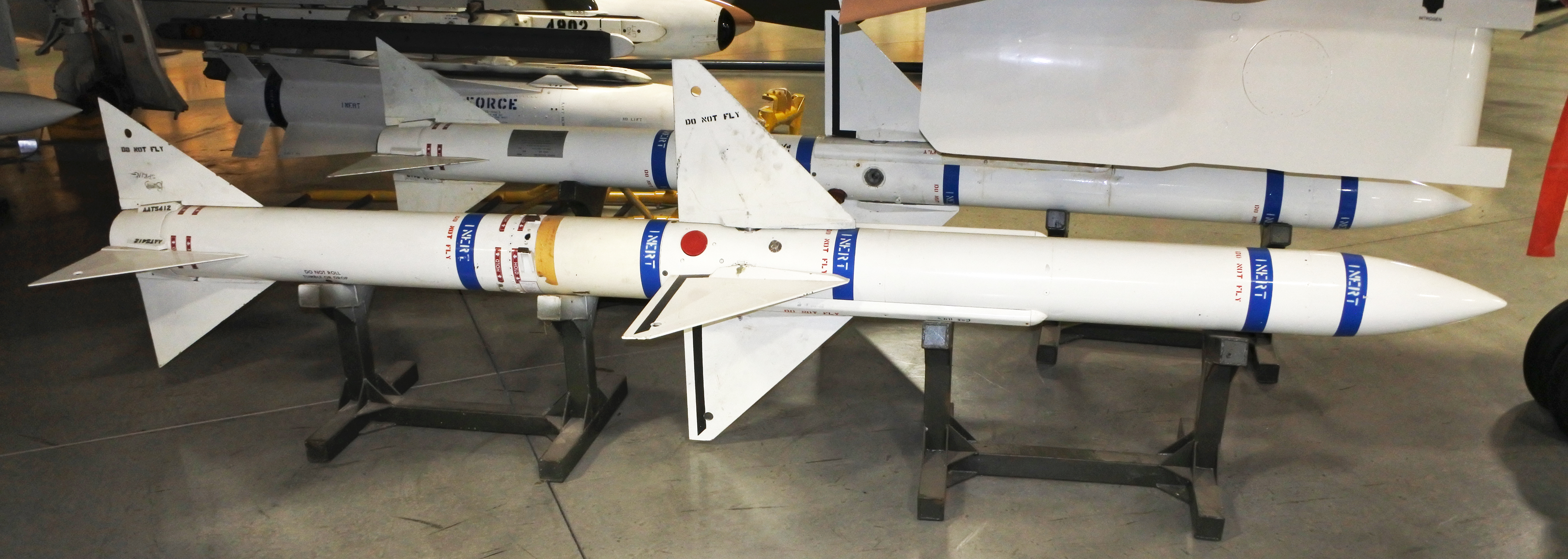
- AIM-7 Sparrow at Hill Air Force Base Museum
- Type: Medium-range, semi-active radar homing air-to-air missile
- Place of origin: United States

Service history
- In service: 1958–present
- Used by: Australia, Canada, Egypt, Greece, Iran, Iraq, Israel, Italy, Japan, Jordan, Kuwait, Malaysia, Saudi Arabia, Singapore, South Korea, Spain, Taiwan, Turkey, United Kingdom, United States
- Wars: Vietnam War; Iran–Iraq War; Gulf War; Russo-Ukrainian War

Production history
- Unit cost: $125,000
- Produced: AIM-7D: 1959; AIM-7F: 1976; AIM-7M: 1982
- No. built: >70,000
- Variants: Sparrow I: AIM-7A; Sparrow II: AIM-7B; Sparrow III: AIM-7C, AIM-7D, AIM-7E, AIM-7E2/Skyflash/Aspide, AIM-7F, AIM-7M, AIM-7P, RIM-7M, AGM-45

Specifications
- Mass: 510 lb (230 kg)
- Length: 12 ft (3.7 m)
- Diameter: 8 in (200 mm)
- Wingspan: 2 ft 8 in (0.81 m) (AIM-7A/B)
- Warhead: High explosive blast-fragmentation AIM-7C/D/E: 65 pounds (29 kg); AIM-7F/M: 88 pounds (40 kg)
- Engine: AIM-7A/B/C – Aerojet 1.8KS7800 solid rocket AIM-7D/E – Rocketdyne MK 38/MK 52 solid rocket AIM-7F/M/P – Hercules MK-58 solid-propellant rocket motor
- Operational range: AIM-7C: 26 km (14 nmi); AIM-7D: 44 km (24 nmi); AIM-7E/E2: 50 km (27 nmi); AIM-7F/M/P: 70 km (38 nmi)
- Maximum speed: AIM-7A/B: Mach 2.5 (1,918 mph, 3,086 kmh, 1,666 kn); AIM-7C/E/F: Mach 4 (3,069 mph, 4,939 kmh, 2,666 kn)
- Guidance system: semi-active radar homing
- Launch platform: Aircraft: McDonnell Douglas F-4 Phantom II; McDonnell Douglas F-15 Eagle; McDonnell Douglas F-15E Strike Eagle; General Dynamics F-16 Fighting Falcon; Grumman F-14 Tomcat; F/A-18 Hornet; JA-37 Viggen; F-104S Starfighter; Tornado F.3 ADV; F/A-18E/F Super Hornet; Mitsubishi F-2

The AIM-7 Sparrow (Air Intercept Missile) is an American medium-range semi-active radar homing air-to-air missile operated by the United States Air Force, United States Navy, United States Marine Corps, and various other air forces and navies. The Sparrow and its derivatives were the West's principal beyond visual range (BVR) air-to-air missile from the late 1950s until the 1990s. It remains in service, although it is being phased out in aviation applications in favor of the more advanced AIM-120 AMRAAM. Since 2023, the AIM-7 and its RIM-7 variant have seen major operational use in Ukraine, where they have been adapted for use in improvised ground-based air defense systems to intercept cruise missiles and loitering munitions.

The early Sparrow was intended primarily for use against larger targets, especially bombers, and had numerous operational limitations in other uses. Against smaller targets, the need to receive a strong reflected radar signal made it difficult to achieve lock-on at the missile's effective range. As the launching aircraft's own radar needed to be pointed at the target throughout the engagement, this meant that in fighter-vs-fighter combat the enemy fighter would often approach within the range of shorter-range infrared homing missiles while the launching aircraft had to continue flying towards its target. Additionally, early models were only effective against targets at roughly the same or higher altitudes, below which reflections from the ground became a problem.

A number of upgraded Sparrow designs were developed to address these issues. In the early 1970s, the RAF developed the Skyflash version with an inverse monopulse seeker and improved motor, while the Italian Air Force introduced the similar Aspide. Both could be fired at targets below the launching fighter ("look-down, shoot-down"), were more resistant to countermeasures, and were much more accurate in the terminal phase. This basic concept then became part of the US Sparrows in the M model (for monopulse) and some of these were later updated as the P model, the last to be produced in the US. Aspides sold to China resulted in the locally produced PL-11. The Japan Self-Defense Forces also employ the Sparrow missile, though it is being phased out and replaced by the Mitsubishi AAM-4.

The Sparrow was also used as the basis for a surface-to-air missile, the RIM-7 Sea Sparrow, used by a number of navies for air defense. Fired at low altitude and flying directly at its target, though, the range of the missile in this role is greatly reduced because of the higher air density of the lower atmosphere. With the retirement of the Sparrow in the air-to-air role, a new version of the Sea Sparrow was produced to address this concern, producing the larger and more capable RIM-162 ESSM.

== Development ==
=== Sparrow I ===
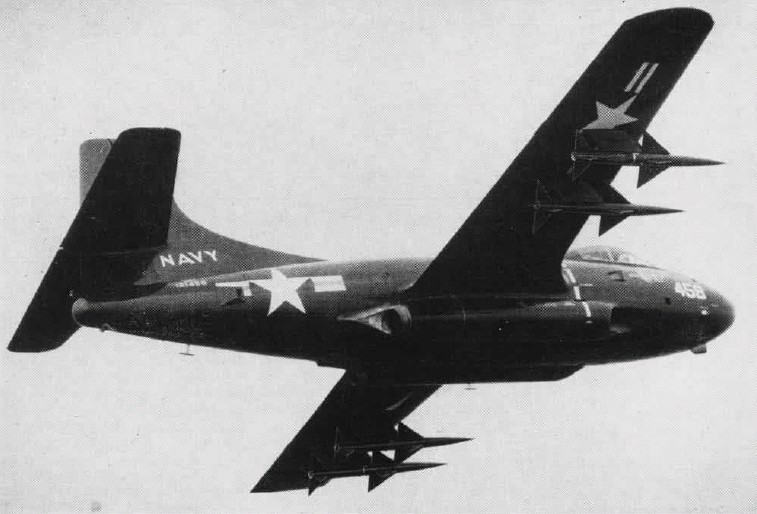
Sparrow I's during tests on a Douglas F3D Skyknight in the early 1950s

The Sparrow emerged from a late-1940s United States Navy program to develop a guided rocket weapon for air-to-air use. In 1947 the Navy contracted Sperry to build a beam-riding version of a standard 5-inch (127 mm) HVAR, the standard unguided aerial rocket, under Project Hotshot. The weapon was initially dubbed KAS-1, then AAM-2, and — from 1948 on — AAM-N-2. The airframe was developed by the Douglas Aircraft Company. The diameter of the HVAR proved to be inadequate for the electronics, leading Douglas to expand the missile's airframe to 8-inch (203 mm) diameter. The prototype weapon began unpowered flight tests in 1947, and made its first aerial interception in 1952.

After a protracted development cycle the initial AAM-N-2 Sparrow entered limited operational service in 1954 with specially modified Douglas F3D Skyknight all-weather carrier night fighters. In 1956, they were joined by the McDonnell F3H-2M Demon and Vought F7U Cutlass fighter aircraft. Compared to the modern versions, the Sparrow I was more streamlined and featured a bullet-shaped airframe with a long pointed nose.

Sparrow I was a limited and rather primitive weapon. The limitations of beam-riding guidance (which was slaved to an optical sight on single-seater fighters and to radar on night fighters) restricted the missile to attacks against targets flying a straight course and made it essentially useless against a maneuvering target. Only about 2,000 rounds were produced to this standard.

=== Sparrow II ===
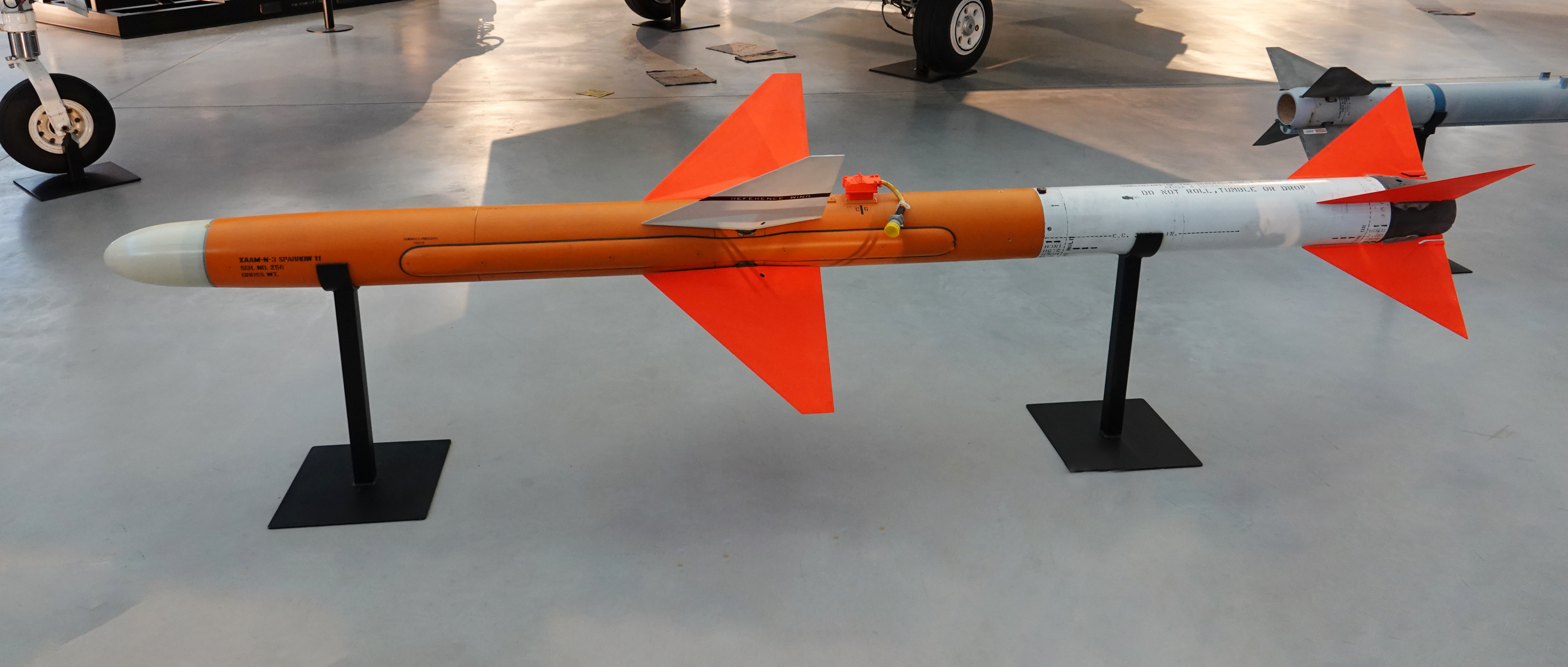
Sparrow 2 Missile

As early as 1950, Douglas examined equipping the Sparrow with an active radar seeker, initially known as XAAM-N-2a Sparrow II, the original retroactively becoming Sparrow I. In 1952, it was given the new code AAM-N-3. The active radar made the Sparrow II a "fire and forget" weapon, allowing several to be fired at separate targets at the same time.

By 1955, Douglas proposed going ahead with development, intending it to be the primary weapon for the F5D Skylancer interceptor. It was later selected, with some controversy, to be the primary weapon for the Canadian Avro Arrow supersonic interceptor, along with the new Astra fire-control system. For Canadian use and as a second source for US missiles, Canadair was selected to build the missiles in Quebec.

The small size of the missile forebody and the K-band AN/APQ-64-radar limited performance, and it was never able to work in testing. After considerable development and test firings in the U.S. and Canada, Douglas abandoned development in 1956. Canadair continued development until the Arrow was canceled in 1959.

=== Sparrow III ===
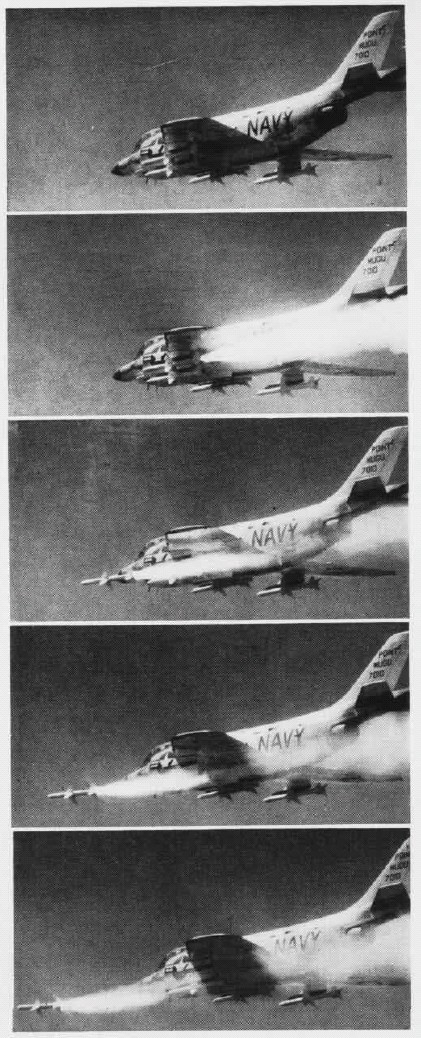
F3H Demon launching a Sparrow III in 1958

Concurrently with the development of the Sparrow I, in 1951 Raytheon began work on a semi-active radar-homing version, the AAM-N-6 Sparrow III. The first of these weapons entered United States Navy service in 1958.

The AAM-N-6a was similar to the -6, and included changes to the guidance electronics to make it effective at higher closing speeds. It was originally designed to take the Thiokol LR44-RM-2 liquid-fuel rocket motor, but the decision was made to retain the solid fuel rocket motor. The -6a was also selected to arm the Air Force's F-110A Spectre (F-4 Phantom) fighters in 1962, known to them as the AIM-101. It entered production in 1959, with 7500 being built.

With an improved Rocketdyne solid-fuel motor, the AAM-N-6b started production in 1963. The new motor significantly increased the maximum range to 35 kilometres (22 mi) for head-on attacks. This new missile also improved tail-on performance, with the AAM-N-6a being capable of firing on only targets with 300 ft/sec closing velocity, and AAM-N-6b being capable of firing on targets with a 300 knot opening velocity (-300 knot closing velocity or higher).

During this year the Air Force and Navy agreed on standardized naming conventions for their missiles. The Sparrows became the AIM-7 series. The original Sparrow I and aborted Sparrow II became the AIM-7A and AIM-7B, despite both being out of service. The -6, -6a, and -6b became the AIM-7C, AIM-7D, and AIM-7E respectively.

25,000 AIM-7Es were produced and saw extensive use during the Vietnam War, where its performance was considered disappointing. The mixed results were a combination of reliability problems (exacerbated by the tropical climate), limited pilot training in fighter-to-fighter combat, and restrictive rules of engagement that generally prohibited BVR (beyond visual range) engagements. The P_{k} (kill probability) of the AIM-7E was less than 10%; US fighter pilots shot down 59 (Note: Figure includes probables and bi-planes, which some sources exclude) aircraft out of the 612 Sparrows fired. Of the 612 AIM-7D/E/E-2 missiles fired, 97 (or 15.8%) hit their targets, resulting in 56 (or 9.2%) kills. Two kills were obtained beyond visual range.

In 1969, an improved version, the E-2, was introduced with clipped wings and various changes to the fuzing. Considered a "dogfight Sparrow", the AIM-7E-2 was intended to be used at shorter ranges where the missile was still traveling at high speeds, and in the head-on aspect, making it much more useful in the visual limitations imposed on the engagements. Even so, its kill rate was only 13% in combat, leading to a practice of ripple-firing all four at once in hopes of increasing kill probability. Its worst tendency was to detonate prematurely about 1,000 feet ahead of the launching aircraft, but it also had many motor failures, erratic flights, and fuzing problems. An E-3 version included additional changes to the fuzing, and the E-4 featured a modified seeker for use with the F-14 Tomcat, enabling it to guide on the pulse-Doppler RADAR emissions of that aircraft in addition to continuous-wave guidance.

=== Vietnam War (1965–1973) records ===
United States Air Force AIM-7 aerial combat kills
Missile firing aircraft	Model	Aircraft shot down	Comments
F-4C Phantom II	AIM-7D	1 MiG-17	555th Tactical Fighter Squadron (TFS)
F-4C	AIM-7E	3 MiG-17s, 10 MiG-21s	389th TFS, 433rd TFS, 480th TFS, 555th TFS
F-4D	AIM-7E	4 MiG-17s, 2 MiG-21s	433rd TFS, 435th TFS, 555th TFS
F-4D	AIM-7E-2	18 MiG-21s, 3 MiG-19s	4th TFS, 13th TFS, 34th TFS, 523rd TFS, 555th TFS
F-4E	AIM-7E-2	8 MiG-21s, 1 MiG-19	4th TFS, 35th TFS, 58th TFS, 366th TFS, 555th TFS

United States Navy AIM-7 aerial combat kills
Missile firing aircraft	Model	Aircraft shot down	Comments
F-4B Phantom II	AIM-7D	4 MiG-17s (includes 2 probables)	US fighters launched from USS Ranger, USS Midway, USS Coral Sea
F-4B	AIM-7E	2 An-2 (Antonov Biplanes), 2 MiG-21s, 1 MiG-17	US fighters launched from USS Constellation and USS Enterprise
F-4J	AIM-7E-2	1 MiG-21	US fighters launched from USS Saratoga

Kill count summary
Category	USAF	USN	Combined
An-2s	—N/a	2	2
MiG-17s	8	5	13
MiG-19s	4	—N/a	4
MiG-21s	38	3	41
Total	50	10	60

=== Post Vietnam ===
Work began in the mid-1960s on a new version in an attempt to address the weapon's limitations. The AIM-7F, which entered service in 1976, had a dual-stage rocket motor for longer range and solid-state electronics for greatly improved reliability. The reduction in volume from the new guidance system also enabled a larger warhead to be fitted, improving the missile's lethality.

The issues encountered by AIM-7 were not exclusive to the US either, with both British Aerospace and the Italian firm Selenia developing improved missiles at the behest of their national governments as the BAe Skyflash and Selenia Aspide. Notably, both missiles incorporated more reliable inverse monopulse seekers, a feature American AIM-7s would not gain until the 1980s.

The most common version of the Sparrow today, the AIM-7M, entered service in 1982 and featured a new inverse monopulse seeker (matching the capabilities of Skyflash and Aspide), active radar proximity fuse, digital controls, improved ECM resistance, and better low-altitude performance. It was used to good advantage in the 1991 Gulf War, where it scored many USAF air-to-air kills. Of 44 missiles fired, 30 (68.2%) hit their intended targets resulting in 24/26 (54.5%/59.1%) kills. 19 kills were obtained beyond visual range.

The AIM-7P is similar in most ways to the M versions, and was primarily an upgrade for existing M-series missiles. Changes were mainly to the software, improving low-level performance. A follow-on Block II upgrade added a new rear receiver allowing the missile to receive mid-course correction from the launching aircraft.

The U.S. Navy planned to operate the missile through 2018.

The Sparrow is now being phased out with the availability of the active-radar AIM-120 AMRAAM, but is likely to remain in service for several years.

The AIM-7 has recently returned to prominence after the United States, Canada, and Greece provided hundreds of AIM-7 and RIM-7 missiles to the Ukrainian Armed Forces for use against cruise missiles, enemy aircraft, and UAVs (drones) during the Russo-Ukrainian War. Because Ukraine lacked compatible Western aircraft, these missiles were integrated into Soviet-era Buk-M1 surface-to-air missile systems under a joint US-Ukrainian project known as "FrankenSAM." This modification allows the radar-guided Sparrow to be launched from ground tracks, providing a critical defense against Russian cruise missiles and Shahed-type drones. In January 2025, Greece further bolstered these stocks by announcing the transfer of an additional 24 RIM-7 missiles specifically for these adapted systems.

=== Variants ===
AIM-7 variants
	AAM-N-2 (AIM-7A)	AAM-N-3 (AIM-7B)	AIM-7C	AIM-7E	AIM-7F	AIM-7M/P	RIM-7M/P
Length	3.74 m (147.3 in)	3.85 m (151.7 in)	3.66 m (144 in)				
Wingspan	0.94 m (37 in)	1.02 m (40 in)					
Finspan	0.88 m (34.8 in)	?	0.81 m (32 in)				0.62 m (24.3 in)
Diameter	0.203 m (8 in)						
Weight	143 kg (315 lb)	176 kg (389 lb)	172 kg (380 lb)	197 kg (435 lb)	231 kg (510 lb)		
Speed	Mach 2.5		Mach 4				
Range	10 km (5.4 nm)	7 km (4 nm)	11 km (6 nm)	30 km (16 nm)	70 km (38 nm)		26 km (14 nm)
Guidance	Constant wave					Inverse monopulse + mid course guidance(P)	
Propulsion	Aerojet 1.8KS7800 solid rocket			Rocketdyne MK 38/MK 52 solid rocket	Hercules MK 58 dual-thrust solid rocket		
Warhead	20 kg (45 lb)		30 kg (65 lb) MK 38 continuous rod		39 kg (86 lb) MK 71 continuous rod	40 kg (88 lb) WDU-27/B blast-fragmentation	

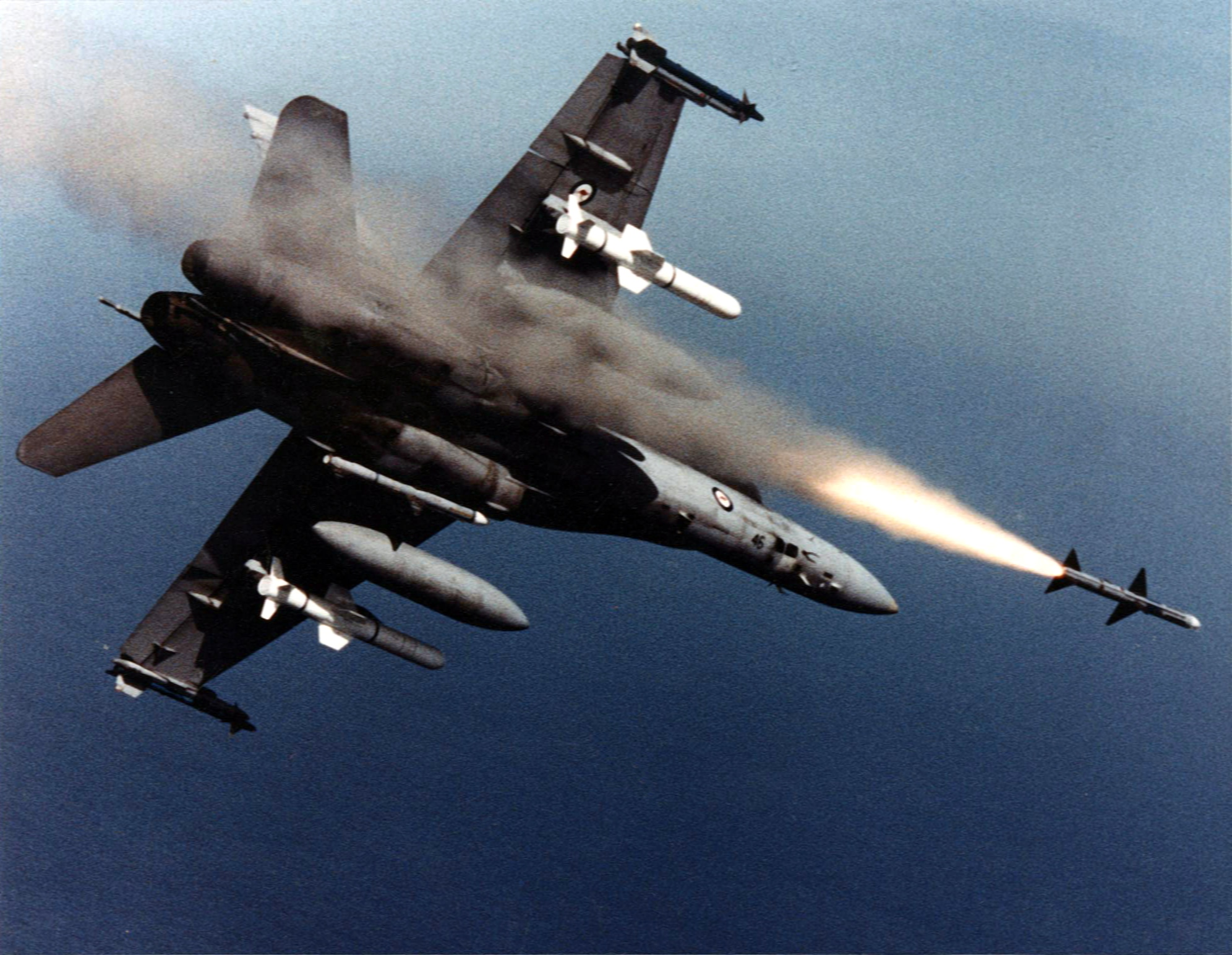
An Australian F-18A Hornet fires an AIM-7 Sparrow missile.

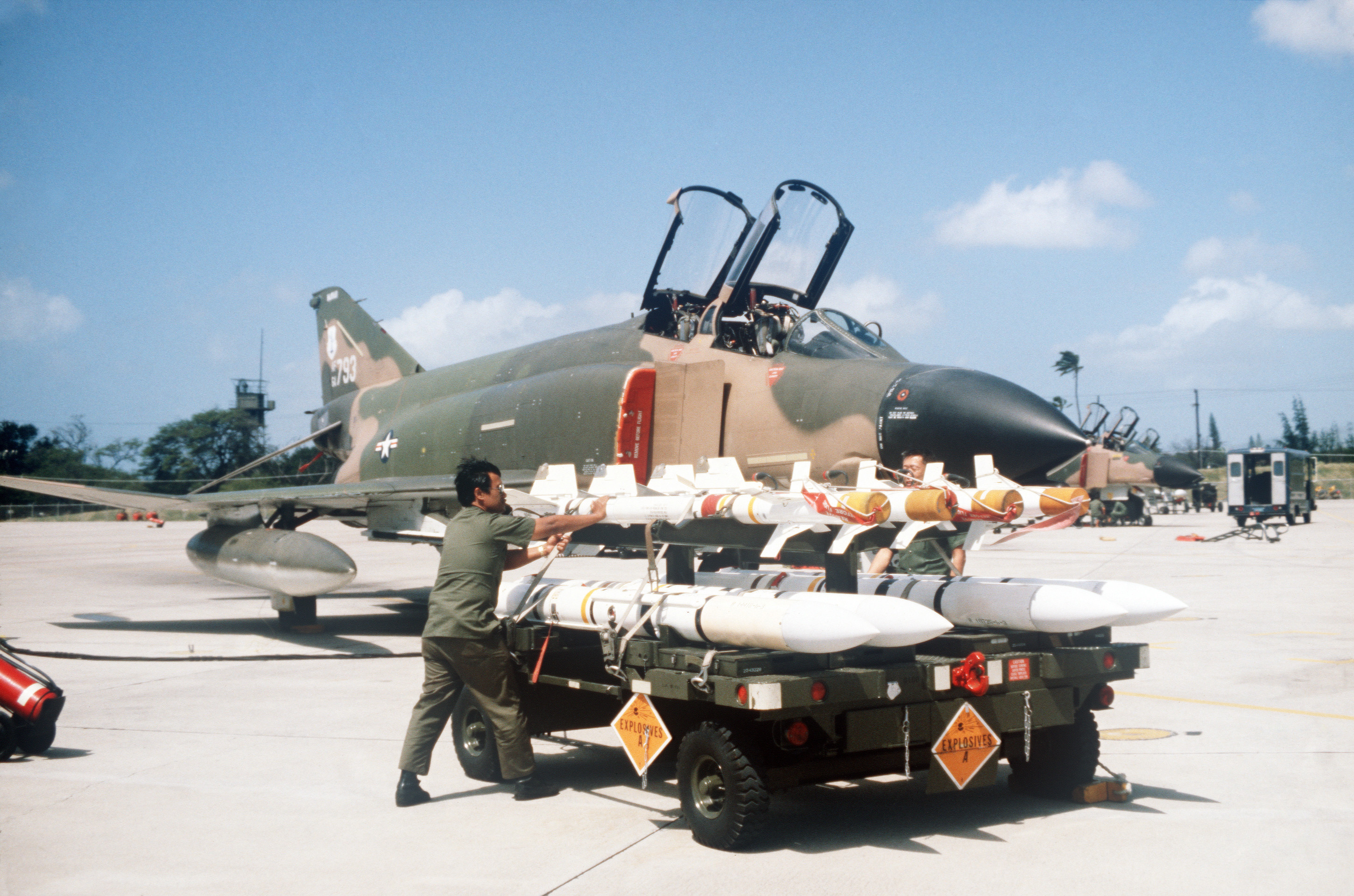
AIM-7Es being loaded on a Hawaii ANG F-4C in 1980

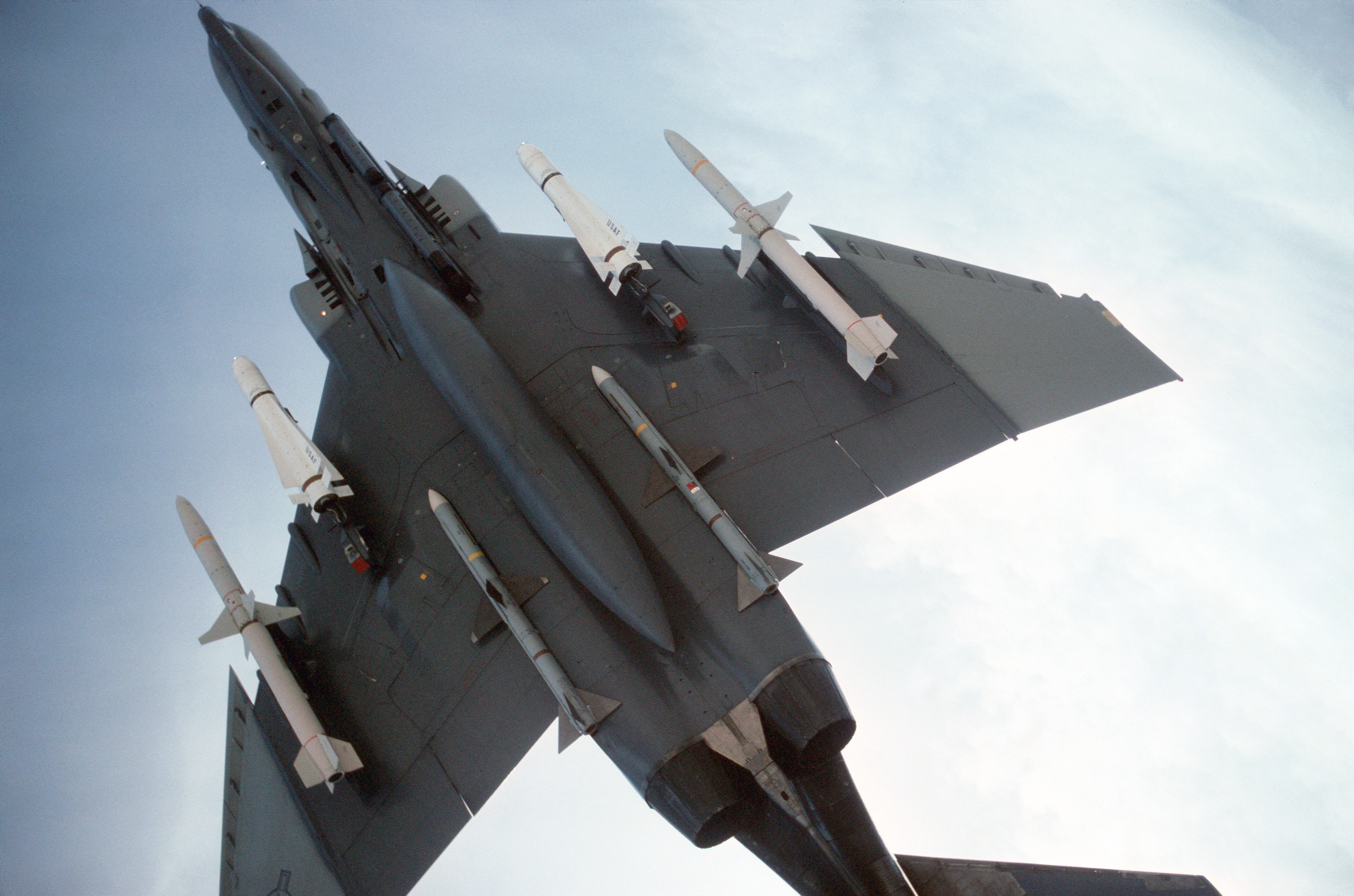
AIM-7Ms on a 37th TFW F-4G in 1988

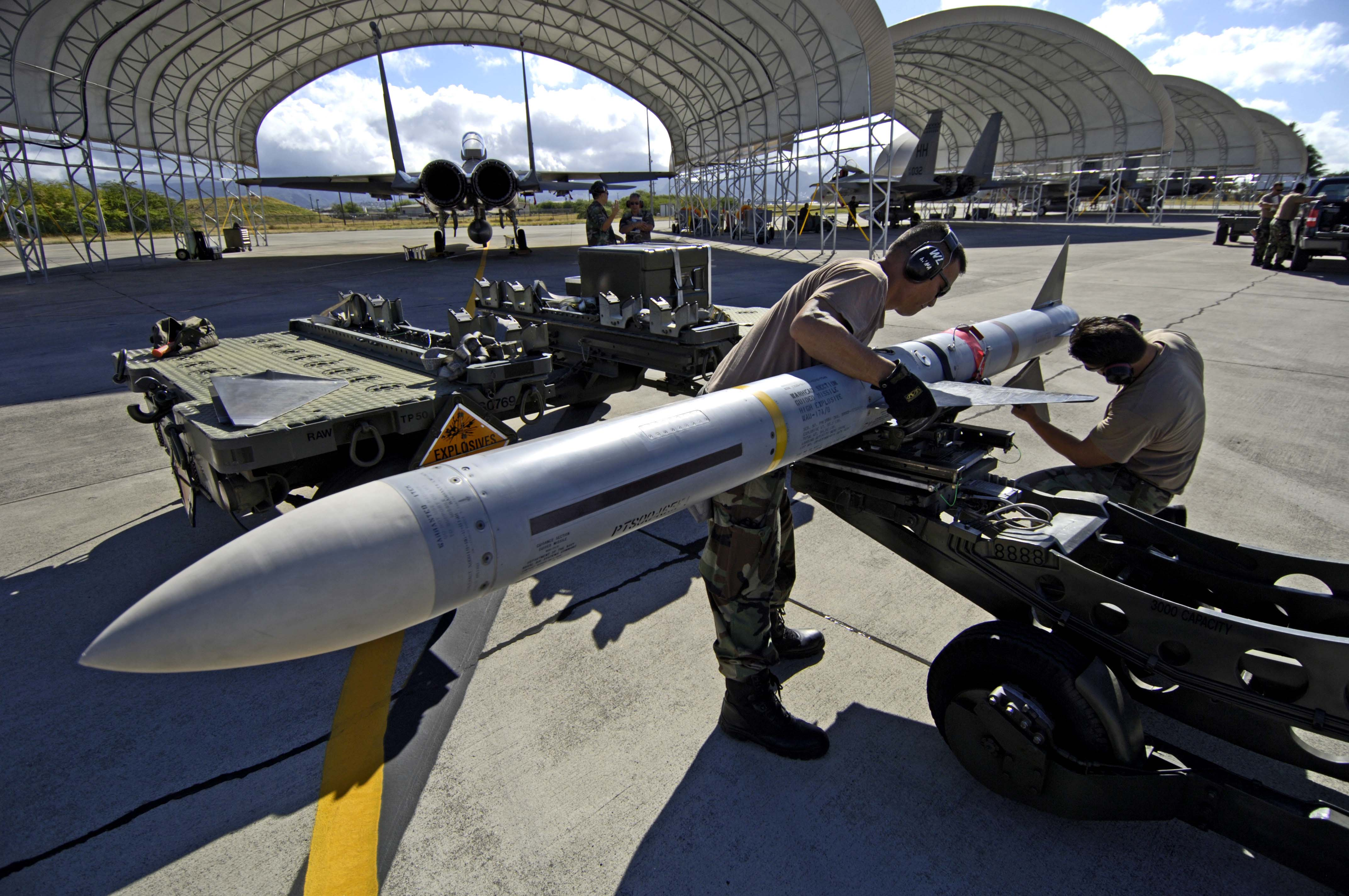
Wings being installed on an AIM-7

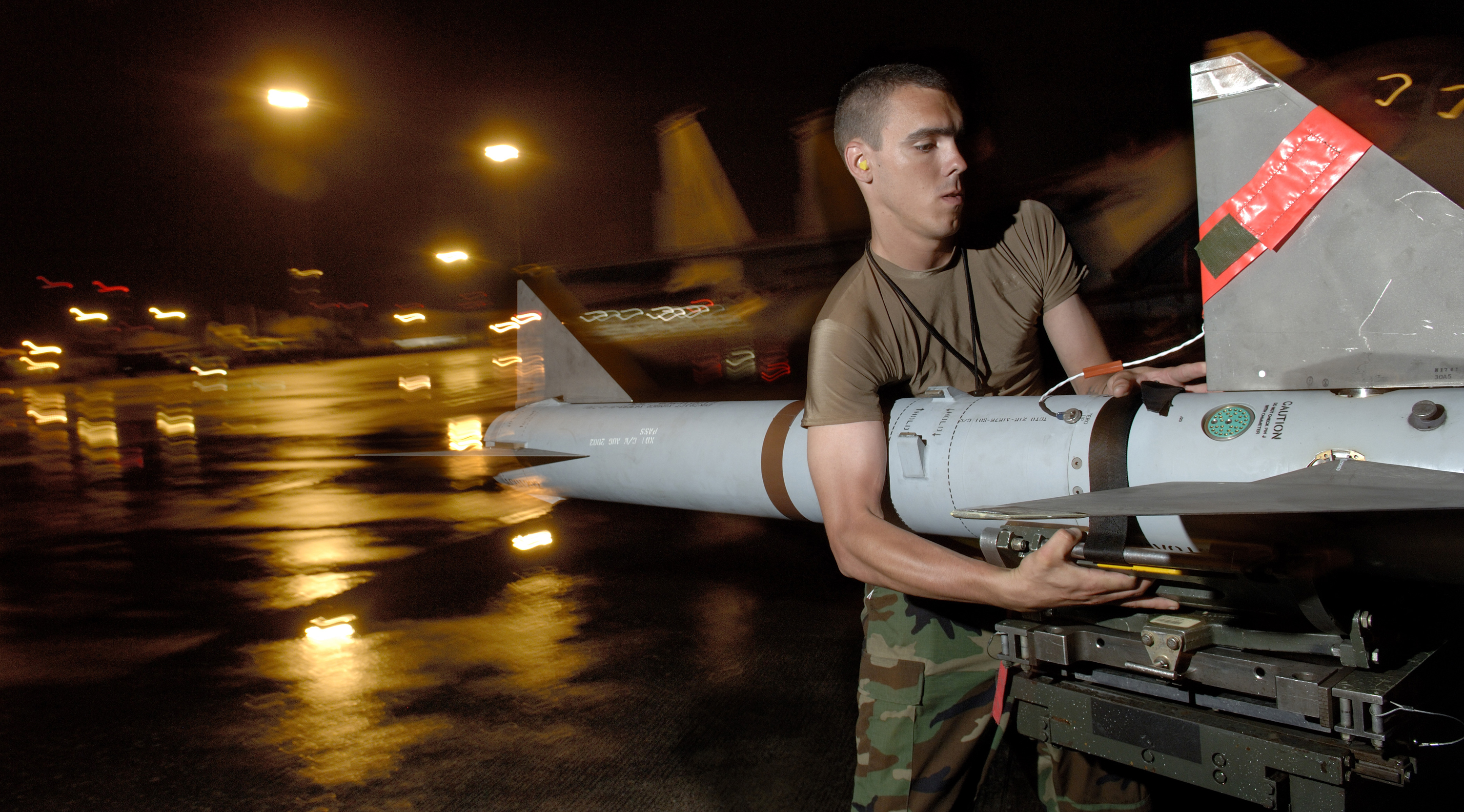
An AIM-7M being loaded

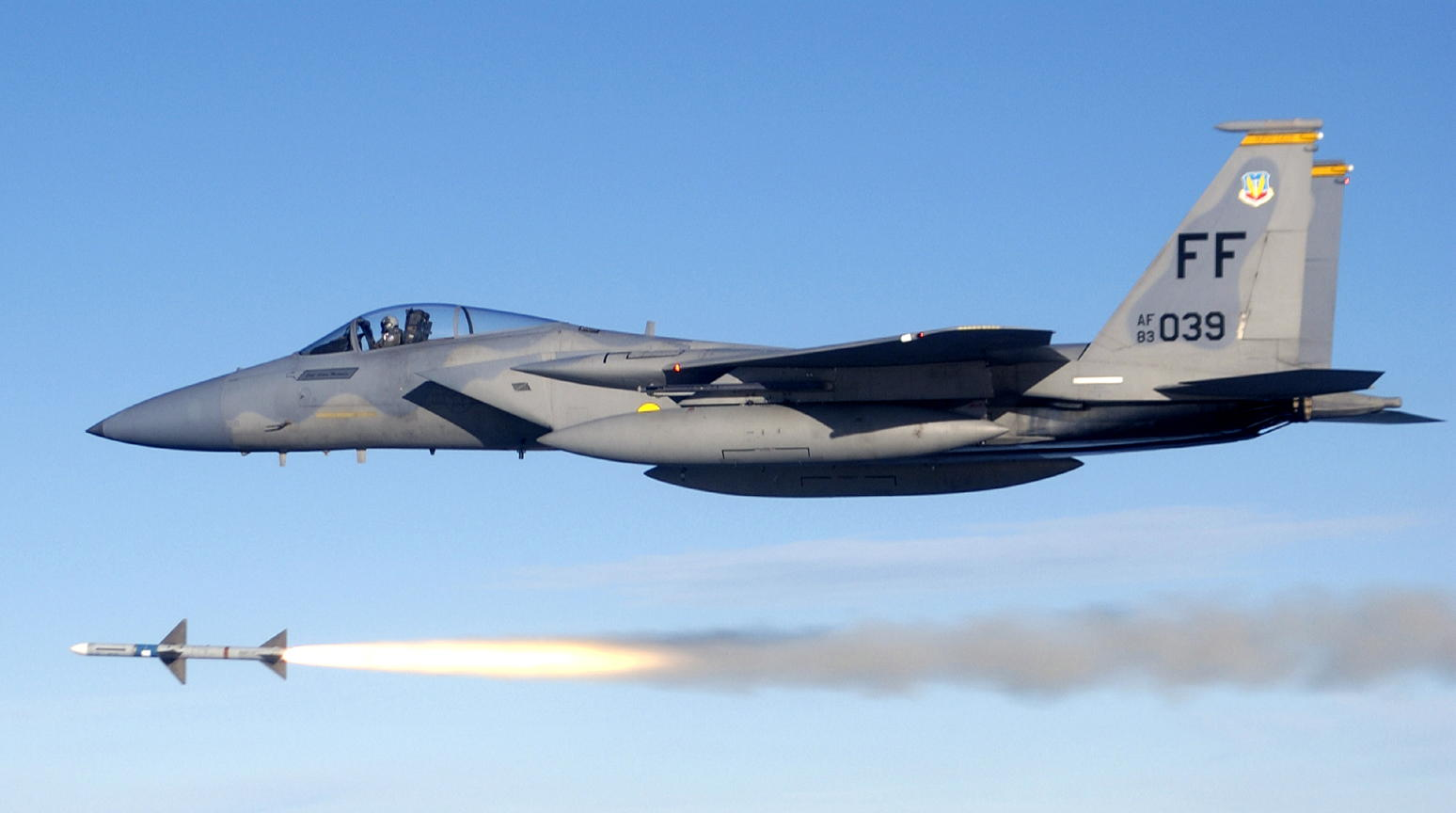
A USAF F-15C fires an AIM-7 Sparrow

Certain AIM-7M variants (and later) were capable of independently lofting to achieve longer-ranges. Some Sparrow variants could be upgraded to later variants.

=== Proposals ===
Sparrow X was a proposal for a missile with a nuclear warhead using the guidance system of Sparrow III. It was to weigh 825.7 lb (374.5 kg) and have a range of 25 mi (40 km) at high altitudes.

AIM-7F Multishot was a proposal under the US Navy's F-4X program of the 1960s to equip the then under development missiles and their launch platforms with a datalink for track-via-missile guidance which would enable multiple AIM-7 missiles to be guided simultaneously. As each missile would only need terminal illumination from the F-4's radar, it could engage multiple aircraft simultaneously as long as it kept all targets within view of its radar. As this modification would have required all-new solid state electronics for the AN/AWG-10 radars on the launching F-4s, it was not pursued.

AIM-7G was an AIM-7F with a new seeker that was compatible with the AN/APQ-130 fire control radar of F-111D. It was canceled in March 1970.

AIM-7R/RIM-7R was to add an infrared homing seeker to an otherwise unchanged AIM-7P/RIM-7P Block II. A general wind-down of the budget led to it being canceled in 1996.

== Foreign versions ==
=== Canada ===
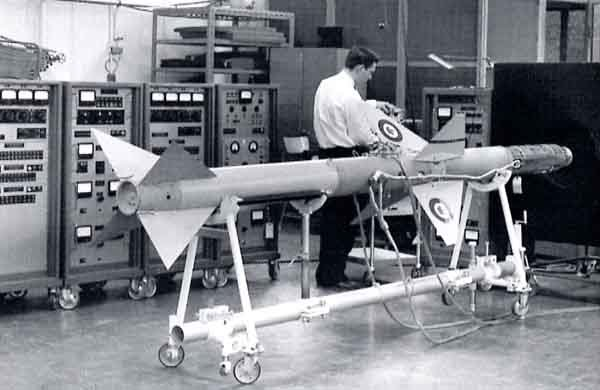
A Sparrow II is tested at a Canadair facility. Note the RCAF roundels painted on the fins.

As part of the Avro Canada CF-105 Arrow program, Canadair (now Bombardier) partnered with Douglas Aircraft Company in the development of the Sparrow II (AAM-N-3/AIM-7B). After Douglas dropped out of this program, Canadair continued on with it until the termination of the Arrow project.

The AAM-N-3 Sparrow II was unique in that it had a fully active radar guidance system. This combined both a radar transmitter and receiver in the missile, making it unnecessary for the pilot to keep the aircraft aimed at the target after firing the missile, unlike semi-active radar homing (SARH) missiles which require continuous radar-assisted guidance throughout flight. This allowed the aircraft that fired the AAM-N-3 to turn away, prosecute other targets, and/or escape from potential retaliatory missiles fired by the enemy aircraft during the time it took for the Sparrow to reach its target. Despite the significant advantages of this design over SARH guidance, all subsequent models of the Sparrow use semi-active radar homing.

To accommodate the active radar guidance system, the AAM-N-3 Sparrow II had a much greater volume than its predecessor. Its size would subsequently set the precedent for all future Sparrow variants.

In 1959, Canadair had completed five missiles based on airframes from Douglas, and built two models from scratch, when the program was canceled with the cancellation of the Arrow.

=== Italy ===
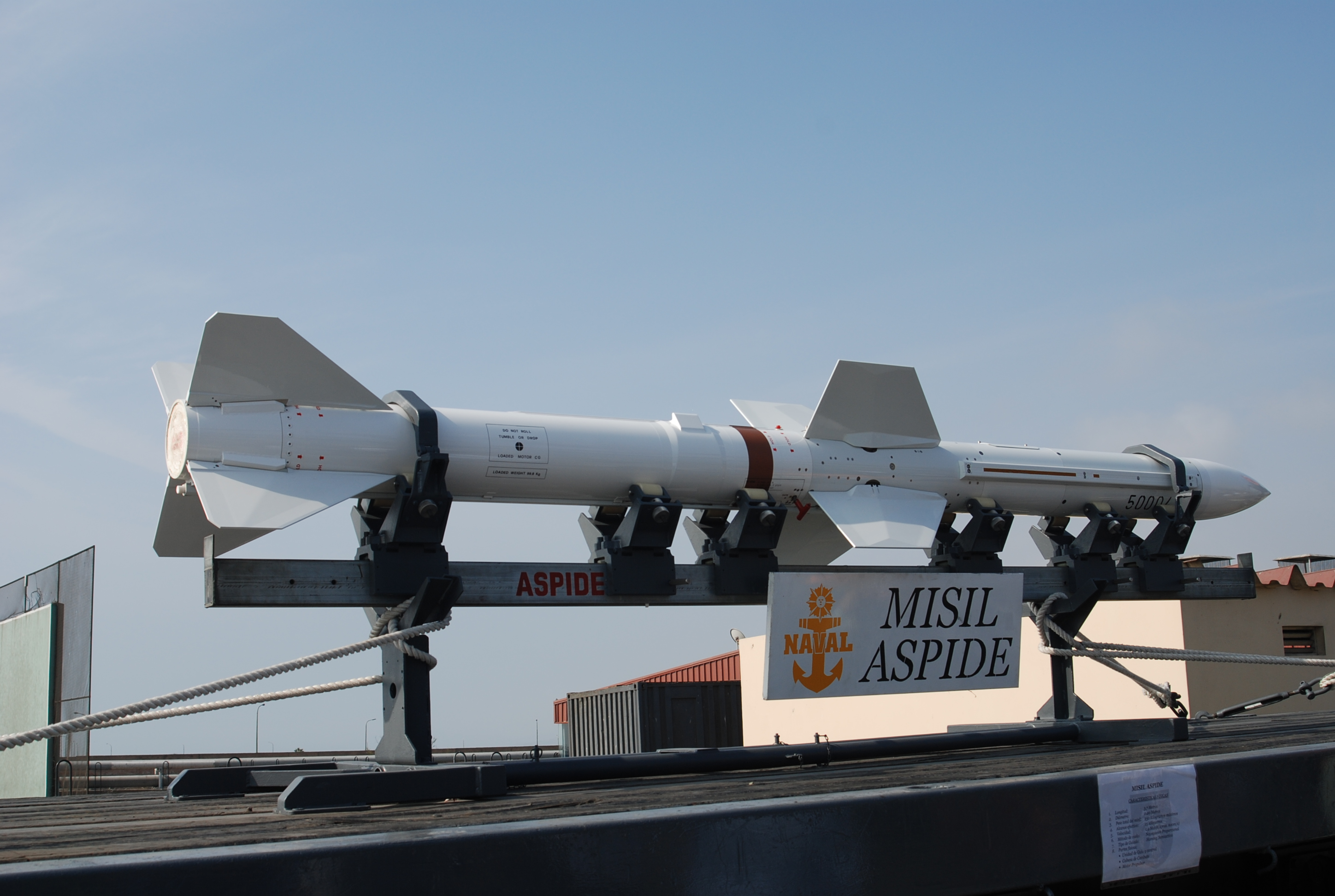
The Aspide was more heavily modified than other Sparrow derivatives like Skyflash, including a new motor, new guidance system and changes to the control surfaces.

The Italian company Selenia (now Leonardo S.p.A.) licensed the AIM-7E Sparrow technology from the US, and produced its own version. Later in the 1970s, Alenia started to produce an improved version of the AIM-7 called the Aspide. Compared to the AIM-7E, it received an improved new monopulse guidance system that allowed for a better hit ratio and easier targeting of enemies at low altitude with ground-clutter confusion. It also received a new and more powerful engine and new control surfaces. These control surfaces were each independent of the others, giving the missile greatly improved maneuverability over the AIM-7E and the British Skyflash that still used dependent control surfaces.

=== People's Republic of China ===
The PL-11 and HQ-6 are a family of Chinese missiles developed by the Shanghai Academy of Science and Technology, largely based on the Italian Aspide version of the Sparrow missile.

=== Soviet Union ===
The Soviet Union acquired an AIM-7 in 1968 and a Vympel team started copying it as the K-25. The missile did not enter production as the R-23 was thought to have better versatility, range, signal processing logic, and immunity to interference. K-25 work ended in 1971, but analysis of the Sparrow was later used to improve the design of the Vympel R-27, particularly the servomechanisms and movable wings.

=== UK ===
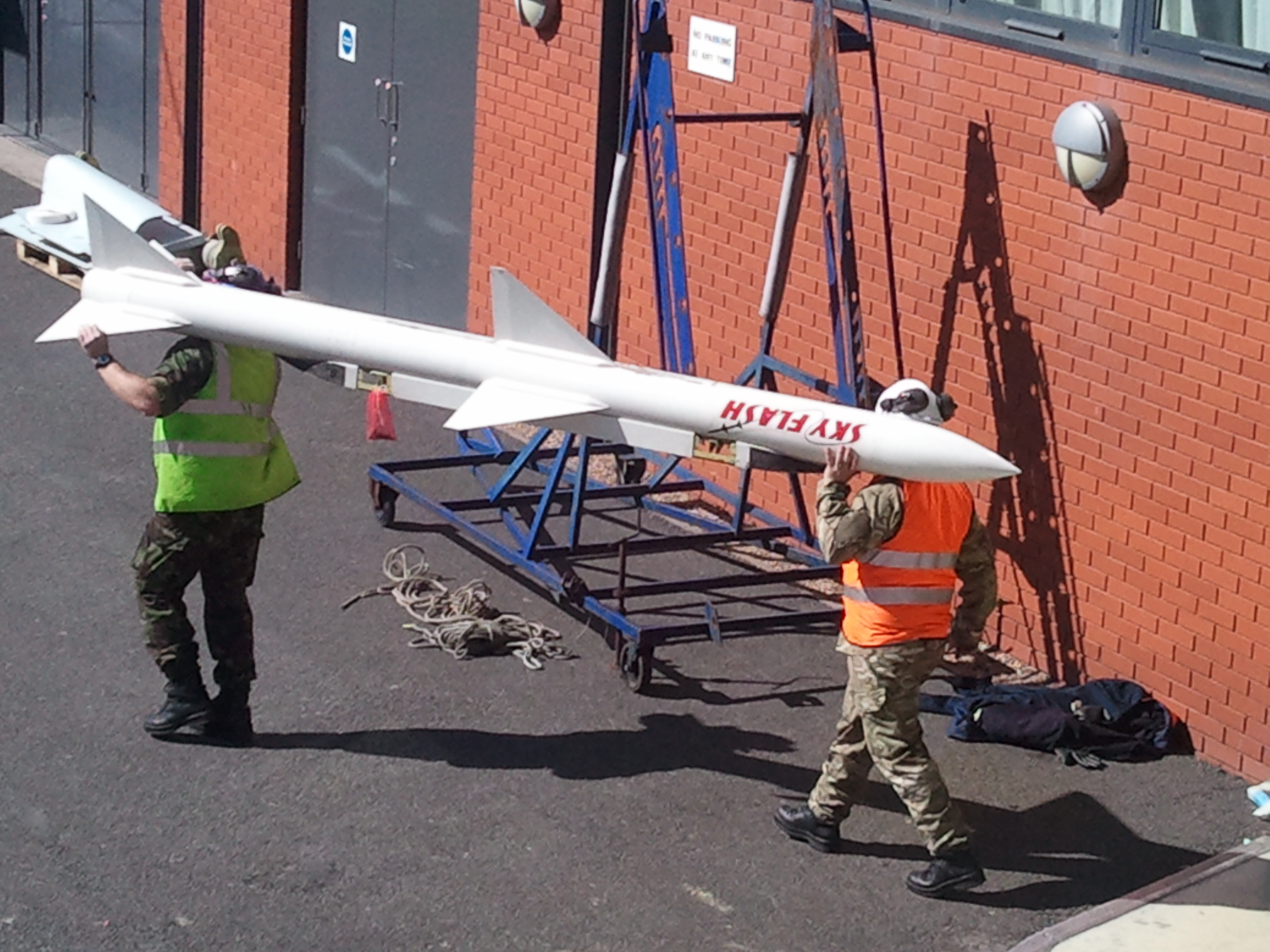
The Skyflash looked identical to the Sparrow from the outside, but housed a greatly improved seeker and upgraded motor.

British Aerospace (BAe) licensed the AIM-7E-2 technology in the 1970s, producing the Skyflash missile. Skyflash used a Marconi XJ521 monopulse seeker together with improvements to the electronics. It was powered by the Aerojet Mk52 mod 2 rocket engine (later by the Rocketdyne Mk38 mod 4). Skyflash entered service with the Royal Air Force (RAF) on their Phantom FG.1 & FGR.2 in 1978, and later on the Tornado F.3. Skyflash was also exported to Sweden for use on their Viggen fighters.

An upgraded version with active radar seeker called Active Sky Flash was proposed by BAe and Thomson-CSF, but the RAF opted to procure AIM-120 AMRAAM instead.

== Design ==
The Sparrow has four major sections: guidance section, warhead, control, and rocket motor (currently the Hercules MK-58 solid-propellant rocket motor). It has a cylindrical body with four wings at mid-body and four tail fins. Although the external dimensions of the Sparrow remained relatively unchanged from model to model, the internal components of newer missiles represent major improvements, with vastly increased capabilities. The warhead is of the continuous-rod type.

As with other semi-active radar guided missiles, the missile does not generate radar signals, but instead homes in on reflected continuous-wave signals from the launch platform's radar. The receiver also senses the guidance radar to enable comparisons that enhance the missile's resistance to passive jamming.

== Principle of guidance ==
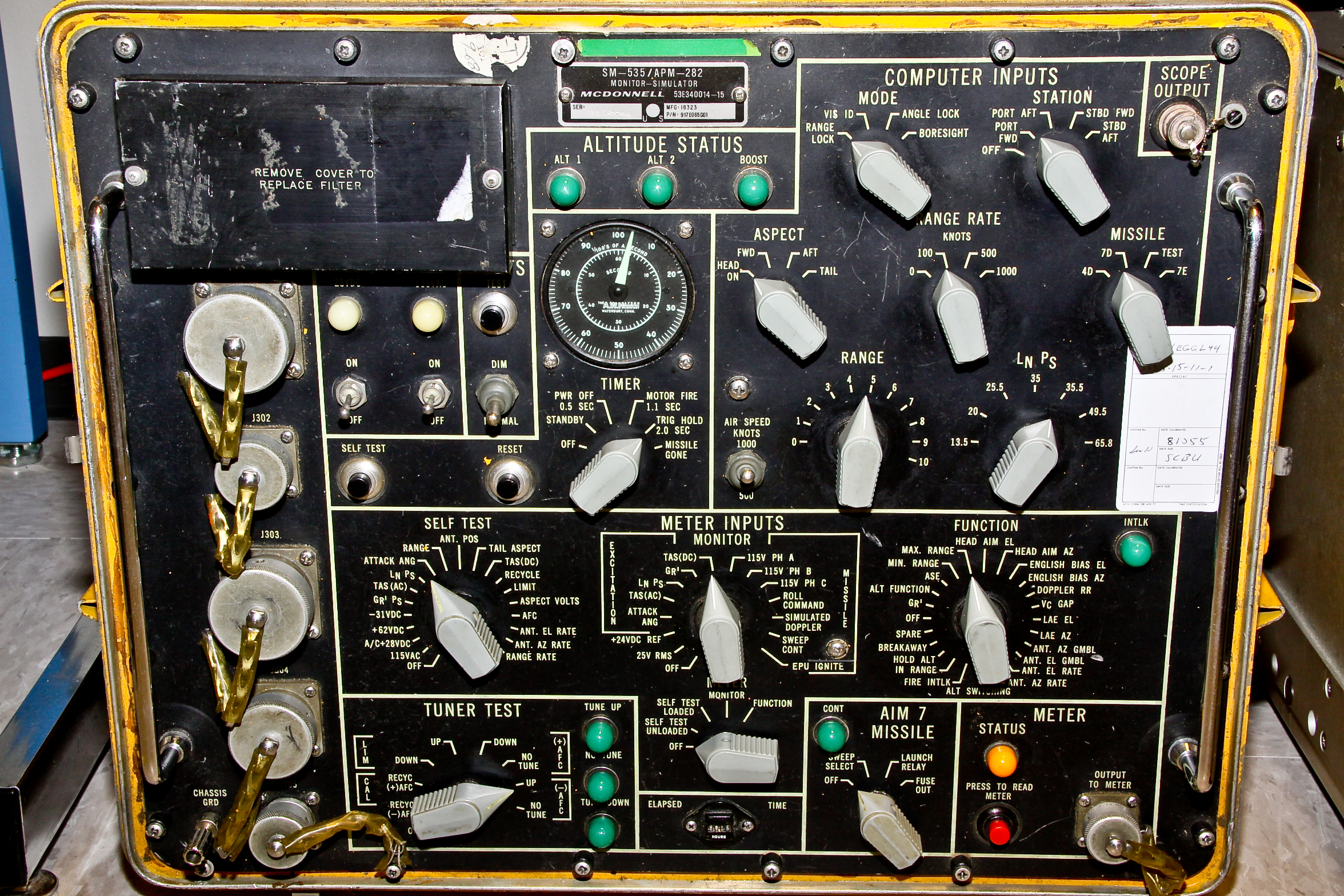
Close-up of an AN/APM-282 test set computer, for testing AIM-7 missile guidance

The launching aircraft illuminates the target with its radar. In 1950s radars, these were single-target tracking devices using a nutating horn as part of the antenna, thereby sweeping the beam in a small cone. Signal processing is applied to determine the direction of maximum illumination, thereby developing a signal to steer the antenna toward the target. The missile detects the reflected signal from the target with a high-gain antenna in a similar fashion and steers the entire missile toward closure with the target. The missile guidance also samples a portion of the illuminating signal via rearward-pointing waveguides. The comparison of these two signals enabled logic circuits to determine the true target reflection signal, even if the target were to eject radar-reflecting chaff.

== Operators ==
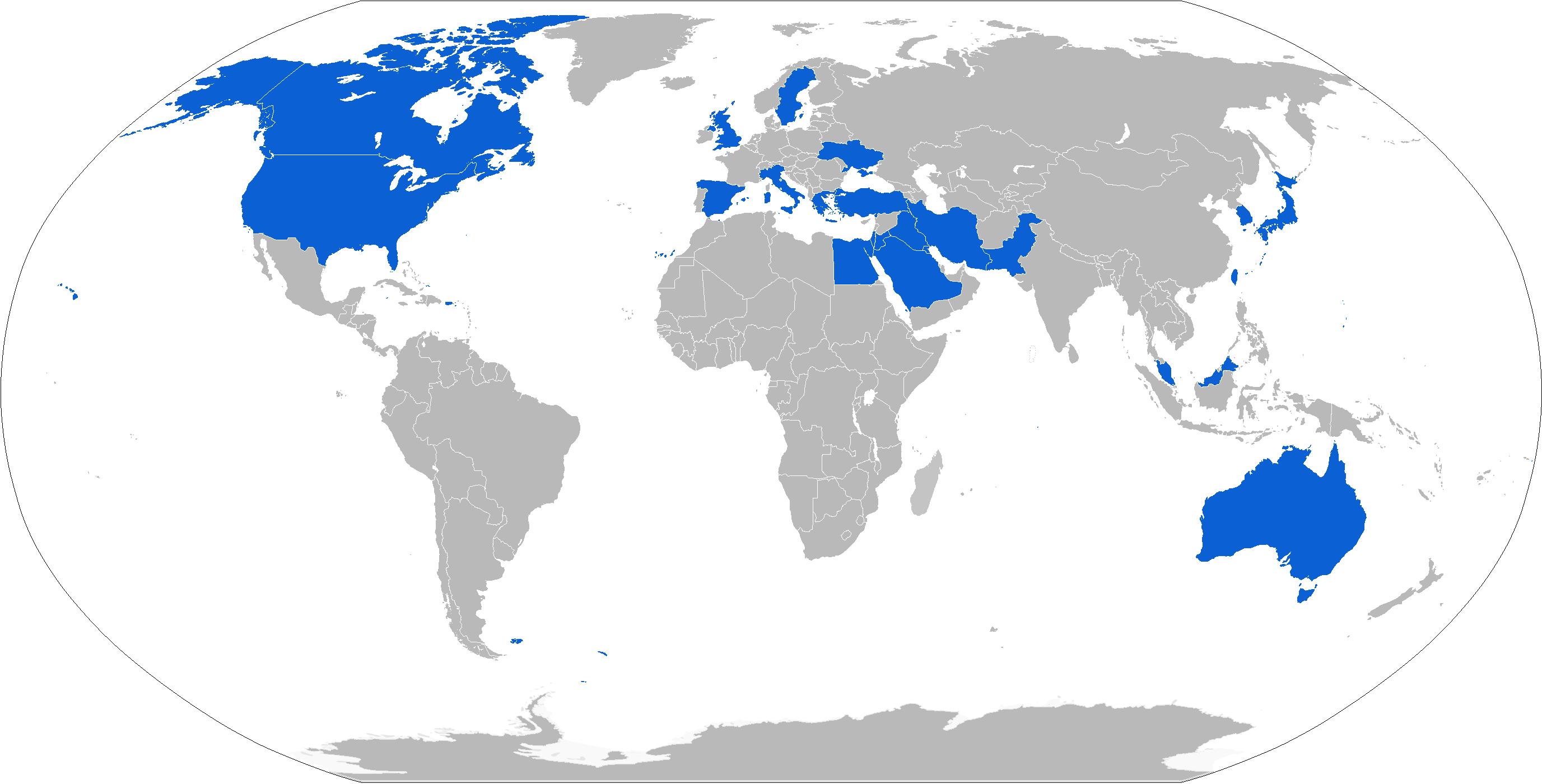
Map with AIM-7 operators in blue

- Australia
- Canada
- Egypt
- Greece
- Iraq
- Iran
- Israel
- Italy
- Japan
- Jordan
- Kuwait
- Malaysia
- Pakistan
- Saudi Arabia
- Singapore
- South Korea
- Spain
- Sweden
- Republic of China
- Turkey
- United Kingdom
- United States
- Ukraine

== See also ==
- List of missiles
- 1963 United States Tri-Service rocket and guided missile designation system

Related development

- RIM-7 Sea Sparrow – (United States)
- RIM-162 ESSM – (United States)
- AGM-45 Shrike – (United States)
- Brazo – (United States)
- Sparoair – (United States)
- Skyflash – (United Kingdom), derivative of the AIM-7
- Aspide – (Italy), air-to-air and surface-to-air missile that uses the AIM-7 airframe

=== Comparable Missiles ===
- R-23 and R-24 – (Soviet Union)
- R-27 – (Soviet Union)
- Super 530 – (France)
