= PL-11 (missile) =

- Type: air-to-air missile
- Place of origin: People's Republic of China

Service history
- Used by: People's Republic of China

Specifications
- Length: 3.7 m (12 ft 2 in)
- Warhead: High explosive blast-fragmentation
- Engine: Solid fuel rocket
- Operational range: 75 km (47 mi)
- Maximum speed: Mach 4 (3,069 mph, 4,939 kmh, 2,666 kn)
- Guidance system: Semi-active radar homing
- Launch platform: aerial

The PL-11 (Chinese: 霹雳-11; pinyin: Pī Lì-11; lit. 'Thunderbolt-11') is a medium-range semi-active radar homing (SARH) air-to-air missile (AAM) developed by a subsidiary of the Shanghai Academy of Spaceflight Technology in the People's Republic of China. It is a development or copy of the Italian Aspide AAM, which in turn was developed from the American AIM-7 Sparrow. The PRC may have started license production of the Aspide using imported parts but the license was cancelled following the 1989 Tiananmen Square protests. Development started in 1990, and the first live-fire test occurred in 1992 from a Shenyang J-8 IIB.

== Description ==
The PL-11 was the People's Liberation Army Air Force's main medium-ranged AAM until the PL-12.

The HQ-61 is the surface-to-air missile (SAM) variant of the PL-11.
