= Royal Australian Navy Beach Commandos =

Unit of the Royal Australian Navy

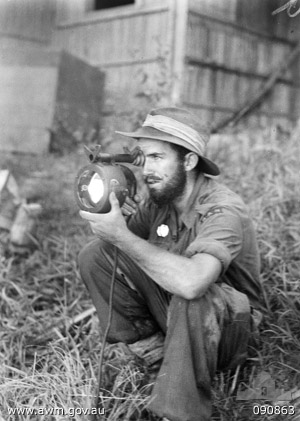
A member of Beach Commando B during the first phase of the landing on Tarakan Island in April 1945

During World War II the Royal Australian Navy (RAN) formed beach commando units to go ashore with the first wave of amphibious assaults. They would conduct local reconnaissance, signpost the beaches, control boat traffic, and communicate with the maritime forces. These were known as Royal Australian Navy Beach Commandos. They took part in the Borneo campaign.

== Training ==
An Amphibious Training Centre was commissioned as HMAS Assault at Port Stephens on 1 September 1942. The Amphibious Training Centre was commanded by Commander F. N. Cook, RAN, an officer who had won the DSC while serving with the Royal Navy during the Bruneval Raid. At the time he was recalled to Australia, Cook was in command of HMS Tormentor, a Royal Navy Combined Operations School. The Port Stephens school trained beach parties and boat crews. Graduates were posted to the Australian landing ships Kanimbla, Manoora, and Westralia, each of which had a beach party as part of its complement.

These beach parties saw little action, as the valuable landing ships were rarely risked in forward areas in 1943. An eight-man RAN beach party under the command of Lieutenant Commander J. M. Band, RANR, participated in the Battle of Scarlet Beach. Band was fatally wounded in the fighting, and was awarded the US Navy Cross posthumously.

In October 1943, the Australian Army's commander in chief, General Sir Thomas Blamey, asked for the beach parties to be detached from their ships for training with the 6th Division and the 1st Beach Group at Cairns. Because United States Navy doctrine was that beach parties were a part of a ship's complement, Rear Admiral Daniel E. Barbey was reluctant to agree. Blamey suggested that a separate unit be raised for service with the Australian Army. A RAN Beach Commando was formed on 6 January 1944.

All RAN Beach Commando personnel were listed as part of the complement of HMAS Assault, but formed a part of the 1st Beach Group. In early 1944, the army raised a 2nd Beach Group, and another beach commando was formed for it. Following Royal Navy practice, the two units were designated Beach Commando A and Beach Commando B. Later, the army requested two smaller commandos for subsidiary operations. These were formed as Beach Commandos C and D, and were organised similarly to A and B, but with only two beach parties, and no boat repair section. The four beach commandos were grouped administratively as the RAN Beach Unit (RANBU) under Commander R. S. Pearson, RAN, as Senior Naval Officer Beach Units (SNOBU).

== Organisation ==
A beach commando consisted of:

- a headquarters with a commander as principal beachmaster, a lieutenant commander as deputy principal beachmaster, and two seamen as messengers
- three beach parties, each commanded by a lieutenant or lieutenant commander as beachmaster, with two officers as assistant beachmasters, two petty officers, and 22 seamen.
- a boat repair and recovery section under a boatswain, with two petty officers and 14 seamen as boat crews, plus two artisan's mates, two torpedomen, a sailmaker's mate, for shipwrights and joiners, four motor mechanics and two stokers in the repair section.
- a beach signals section under a sub lieutenant or midshipman, with a yeoman of signals, a petty officer telegraphist, four leading seamen. two leading telegraphists, ten signalmen, and 10 telegraphists.

== Operations ==
In April 1945, Beach Commando B under Commander B. G. B. Morris, RANVR, went into action in the Battle of Tarakan, supporting the Army's 26th Infantry Brigade and 2nd Beach Group. Two beach commandos were killed and two wounded. Morris was awarded the U.S. Bronze Star for his role in the Tarakan Landings.

Beach Commandos A and C, under Lieutenant Commander R. McKauge D.S.C., RANVR, took part in the 9th Division and 1st Beach Group's landings at Brunei and Labuan.

Beach Commandos B and D participated in the 7th Division and 2nd Beach Group's landings in the Battle of Balikpapan.

== See also ==
- Royal Naval Commandos
