= Beach Jumpers =

US Navy special warfare units (1943-1946; 1951-1972)

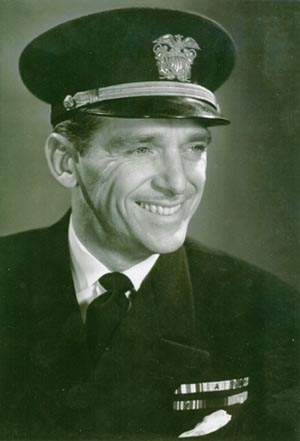
Douglas Fairbanks Jr., "Father of the U.S. Navy Beach Jumpers"

Beach Jumpers were U.S. Navy special warfare units organized during World War II by Lieutenant Douglas Fairbanks Jr. They specialized in deception and psychological warfare. The units were active from 1943 to 1946 and 1951 to 1972.

== Inspired by British tactics ==
Lieutenant Douglas Fairbanks Jr., the Hollywood actor and naval officer, was assigned as a United States liaison officer to British Admiral Lord Louis Mountbatten, who was British Chief of Combined Operations, which included British Commando operations. This included undertaking training at HMS Tormentor, a Commando training facility in Southern England. Fairbanks not only observed the training, planning, and execution of the Commando's raiding parties, diversions, and deception operations, but he trained with the unit and participated in several cross channel harassment raids. During these raids he developed a deep appreciation for the military art of deception.

When he returned to the U.S., Fairbanks presented his idea for a unit of men trained to conduct tactical cover, diversionary and deception missions to Admiral Ernest J. King, Commander-in-Chief, U. S. Fleet and Chief of Naval Operations. Inspired by the success of the British Commando in using sonic deception on raids against the Nazis and Fairbanks' concept of operations, King issued a secret letter on 5 March 1943 charging the Vice Chief of Naval Operations with the responsibility to recruit 180 officers and 300 enlisted men for the Beach Jumper program. Admiral H. Kent Hewitt Commander of Amphibious Forces and all U.S. Naval Forces in Northwest African waters and the Western Mediterranean, was put in charge.

=== Volunteer requirements ===
Beach Jumper volunteers had to meet four general requirements: no seasickness, experience with small boat handling, enough electrical knowledge to fix a home radio, and basic knowledge of celestial navigation. The announcement further stated that, "The Navy is requesting volunteers for prolonged, hazardous, distant duty for a secret project."

Their identities and activities were very highly classified, since the slightest leak of information could ruin even brilliant deceptions. Their early basic mission was "To assist and support the operating forces in the conduct of Tactical Cover and Deception in Naval Warfare." To accomplish it, they learned to simulate very large amphibious landings with very limited forces. Using specialized deception equipment, a few dozen Beach Jumpers could make the enemy believe they were a 70,000-man amphibious landing force, when in fact that force would be elsewhere, usually a great distance away.

=== Unit organization ===
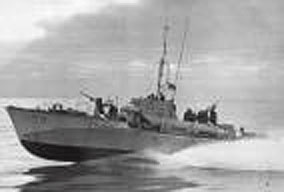
63-foot ASR

On 16 March 1943, the volunteers reported to the Amphibious Training Base at Camp Bradford, Virginia, forming Beach Jumper Unit One. The group was trained in small boat handling, seamanship, ordnance, gunnery, demolition, pyrotechnics, and meteorology. The unit was assigned ten 63-foot double-hulled plywood air-sea rescue (ASR) boats, each manned by an officer and a six-man crew. The boats were equipped with twin 50 caliber machine guns, 3.5-inch window rockets, smoke pots and generators, and floating time-delay explosive packs. They also carried the unit's specialized deception equipment: the multi-component "heater," consisting of a wire recorder; 5-phase amplifier, and 1000 watt, 12 horn speaker; and ZKM and MK-6 Naval balloons to which strips of radar reflective window had been attached. The latter could be towed behind the boats to enhance their radar cross-section. Later, the Beach Jumpers acquired various jamming transmitters such as the APT-2 (Carpet); APQ-2 (Rug); AN/APT-3 (Mandrel); AN/SPT-4; AM-14/APT; AM-18/APT; and AN/SPT-1 (DINA). When the units were reactivated for the Korean War the designation of the 63-foot boats was changed to AVR (aviation rescue) since that was the purpose of the boats at the time. Fueling of Beach Jumper Unit 1 boats, stationed at the Amphibious Base in Coronado, California, was done at the North Island Naval base at Coronado since that was the location of the high octane fuel needed to run the twin Hall Scott engines in each boat. In 1953 another boat was added to the six 63 footers at BJU1; a 104-foot AVR used as the command boat.

The Beach Jumpers got their name because of their ability to quickly hit the beach and confuse the enemy with harassment and deception operations. During a high level conference, someone stated that the purpose of the Beach Jumpers' work was "to scare the be-jesus out of the enemy." The term "BJ factor" was used thereafter in their planning, and is said to have inspired the cover name Beach Jumpers.

== Action during World War II ==
Beach Jumpers saw much action in World War II. Their first operation was in Operation Husky. On the night of 10 July 1943, Beach Jumper Unit 1 (BJU 1) was ordered to conduct a diversion off Cape San Marco, 100 miles west of the HUSKY landing area. The first attempt was recalled due to hazardous seas. On D+1, the weather was better and the operation began at 22:00. At 3,000 yards off shore, three of the ASRs prepared their heaters, one ASR proceeded a thousand yards ahead and began to lay smoke. As the sound boats prepared to make their run parallel to the beach, a searchlight from Cape San Marco illuminated the area, accompanied by small arms and artillery fire. At 02:30 the sound boats were ordered to secure their heaters and approach the beach, which they did, firing guns and rockets. All boats retired on a course back to their home port at Pantelleria, Sicily.

To keep the Germans' attention, the unit was ordered to conduct another operation on the night of 12 July 1943, using all available craft. This time the shore batteries were completely alerted. The Germans were convinced that a landing was about to take place. Salvos of six-inch and smaller guns were thrown at the boats. The operation was a success and no casualties were sustained.

Operation Husky accomplished complete surprise due to the uncertainty created in the minds of some German commanders by the diversions and deception operations. BJU-1 was responsible for an entire German Reserve Division being held in place, as the German command was unsure where the actual landing would take place.

Beach Jumpers continued to work successfully in the Mediterranean through the summer of 1944. Beach Jumper operations in the Pacific were less rewarding, but at least one diversion proved effective, allowing the 34th Regimental Combat team and the 38th and 11th Airborne Divisions to land with little or no opposition.

Shortly after the end of World War II, all Beach Jumper Units were deactivated.

== Service in Cold War, Vietnam ==
Beach Jumpers were reactivated in 1951, in spite of the objections of those who questioned the worth of a deception unit in more sophisticated times. A Beach Jumper unit was given a chance to prove its worth when an important training exercise was being planned. The Beach Jumpers knew that fleet communications from the force commander to ships at sea were relayed through radio Washington. Pretending to be the force commander, they sent a message, via Radio Washington, ordering every ship's commanding officer to report to the flagship the next morning to discuss terminating the exercise. The next morning at least half of the commanding officers were aboard the flagship in a state of mounting confusion and anger. There were no more doubts about the value of the Beach Jumper program.

Through the late-1950s and into the early-1960s as the Cold War evolved into the "counterinsurgency era", Beach Jumper expertise in the area of manipulative and imitative deception and electronic warfare (EW) was employed in revolutionary new ways, both during scheduled fleet exercises and on actual operations. Additionally, they acquired a new secondary mission: "To plan and execute psychological operations in support of commands to which assigned."

Several Beach Jumper teams were active in the Vietnam War, responsible for tactical deception and for employing psychological operations (PSYOPS), which was also their unclassified cover activity. They operated from several naval platforms including the USS Iwo Jima and USS Tripoli. Their primary mission was to assist and support the operating forces in the conduct of tactical cover and deception. They conducted monitoring, tape preparation, and Soviet signal intelligence SIGINT trawler jamming missions from destroyers. Some of the men became paratroopers, possibly to add credibility to the Beach Jumper cover name.

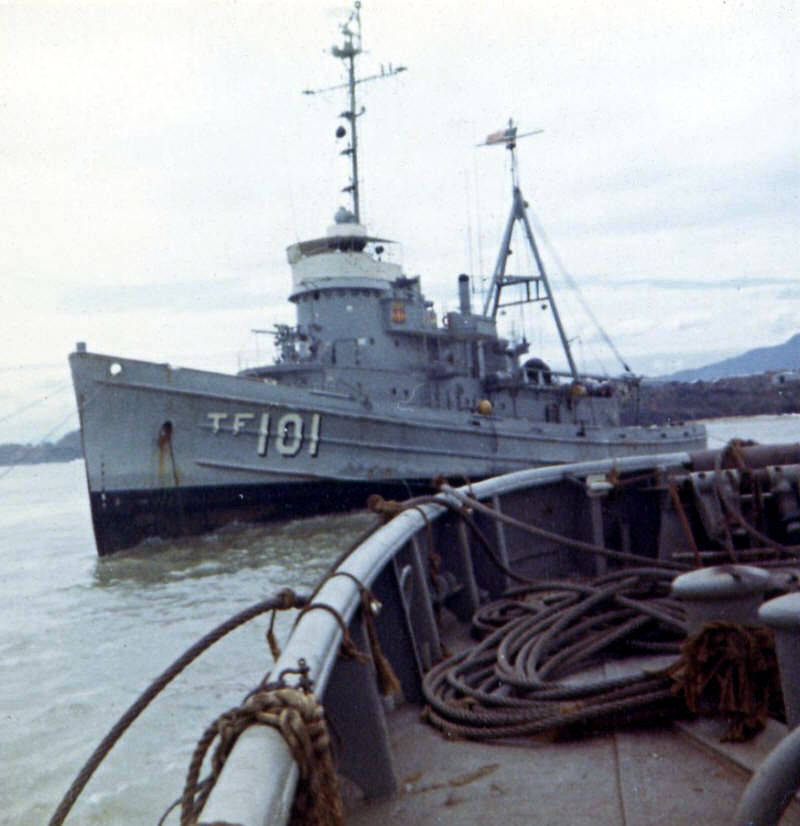
USS Cocopa in Vietnamese waters, 1967.

Other Beach Jumpers operated under the cover name "Yankee Station Special Surveillance Unit", aboard fleet tugs such as the USS Cocopa. Their mission was to deceive and jam Soviet signal intelligence (SIGINT) and electronics intelligence (ELINT) trawlers that were monitoring U.S. naval operations in the Gulf of Tonkin. This group conducted counter-SIGINT trawler activities which included random jamming with noises that included bagpipe recordings.

== Retirement ==
The Beach Jumper name was retired in 1972, and the Beach Jumper mission was assigned to Fleet Composite Operational Readiness Group One (FLTCORGRU 1). In 1986, Fleet Tactical Deception Group Pacific (FLTDECGRUPAC) and Fleet Tactical Deception Group Atlantic (FLTDECGRULANT) were formed, with the mission of "Assisting Commanders in the planning and conduct of tactical military deception operations."

Former Beach Jumpers are eligible to join the U.S. Navy Beach Jumpers Association and to be Associate Members of the UDT-SEAL Association.
