= USS Cocopa =

Tugboat of the United States Navy

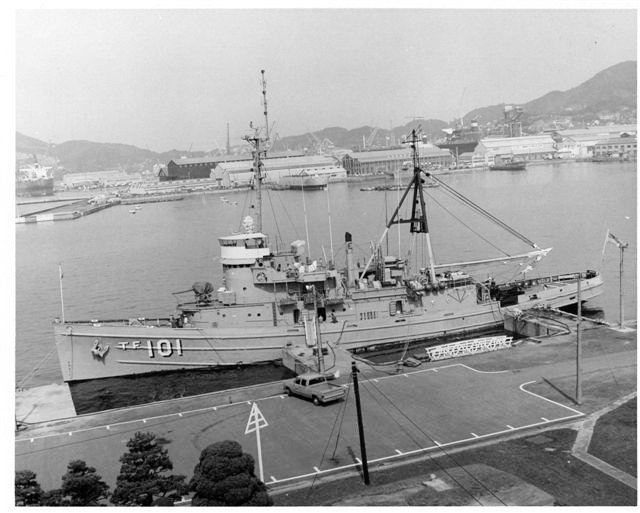
- USS Cocopa (ATF-101) at Sasebo, Japan, likely 1969 or 1972.

History

United States
- Name: USS Cocopa
- Builder: Charleston Drydock and Shipbuilding Company, Charleston, SC
- Launched: 5 October 1943
- Sponsored by: Miss Z. Williams
- Commissioned: 25 March 1944
- Decommissioned: 30 September 1978
- Stricken: 30 September 1978
- Identification: ATF-101
- Motto: Service - Salvage - First and Finest
- Honors and awards: 1 battle star (Korean War); 5 campaign stars (Vietnam War)
- Fate: Sold to Mexico, 30 September 1978

Mexico
- Name: ARM Seri
- Acquired: 30 September 1978
- Identification: RE-03
- Status: In active service as of 2017

General characteristics
- Class & type: Abnaki-class fleet ocean tug
- Displacement: 1,240 long tons of standard displacement
- Length: 205 ft (62 m)
- Beam: 38.5 ft (11.7 m)
- Draft: 15.33 ft (4.67 m)
- Propulsion: Diesel-electric, single screw, 3,600 shp (2,685 kW)
- Speed: 16.5 knots (30.6 km/h; 19.0 mph)
- Complement: 85
- Sensors & processing systems: Radar
- Armament: 1 × 3 in (76 mm) dual-purpose gun; 2 × twin 40 mm antiaircraft guns; 2 × 20 mm single antiaircraft guns

USS Cocopa (ATF-101) was an Abnaki-class fleet ocean tug that served on active duty with the U.S. Navy from 1944 to 1978, seeing action in World War II, the Korean War and the Vietnam War. After thirty-four years of service, she was sold to the Mexican Navy, where she was still in service as of 2009.

== World War II ==
Cocopa was named after an Arizona Indian tribe. She began her naval career with the Atlantic fleet during the waning months of World War II, making two passages across the Atlantic with barges in tow, followed by a third passage to Trinidad. Her second convoy was attacked by a German U-boat, with Cocopa barely escaping destruction. Cocopa was next ordered to the Pacific theater, witnessing the final days of the war between July and August of that year. V-J Day found the ship in Leyte, Philippines.

== Interwar service ==
Following World War II, Cocopa shuttled between the Philippines, Shanghai, Okinawa and Hong Kong on occupation duty, before returning to Puget Sound Naval Shipyard in January 1947 for an overhaul. From 1948–49 she plied Alaskan waters.

30 June 1951, having returned to the Far East, Cocopa accepted what many writers have termed the last Japanese surrender from World War II. Lieutenant Commander James B. Johnson accepted the capitulation of Captain Katsusaburo Usui and nineteen other Japanese soldiers who had been living on the island of Anatahan, in the Northern Mariana Islands since 12 June 1944. The ship repatriated these men and their personal effects to Guam, from whence they were ultimately returned to Tokyo, Japan on 6 July 1951. However, other Japanese holdouts continued to surrender over the next few decades, though in much smaller numbers.

== Korean War ==
Cocopa saw action in the Korean War during the summer of 1953. During this period she served off both Korean coasts; in one operation, she towed HMCS Huron, a Royal Canadian Navy destroyer that had run aground on the island of Pang Yang-Do, just off the North Korean coast well north of enemy-held Wonsan harbor. At the time of the armistice, she went to Wonsan to aid in the removal of a Marine garrison occupying a small islet at the harbor's mouth. During the Korean War, USS Cocopa received one battle star for her service.

After the war, Cocopa conducted numerous Pacific Ocean and Alaskan cruises. Her home port was changed from Pearl Harbor to San Diego in 1961.

== Operation Castle ==
In March 1954, Cocopa was one of the ships tasked to support Operation Castle, a series of high-energy (high-yield) nuclear tests by Joint Task Force SEVEN (JTF-7) at Bikini Atoll. Official reports indicated that crewmembers suffered the highest doses (2.2 rem) of radiation endured by any of the navy ships present at this operation.

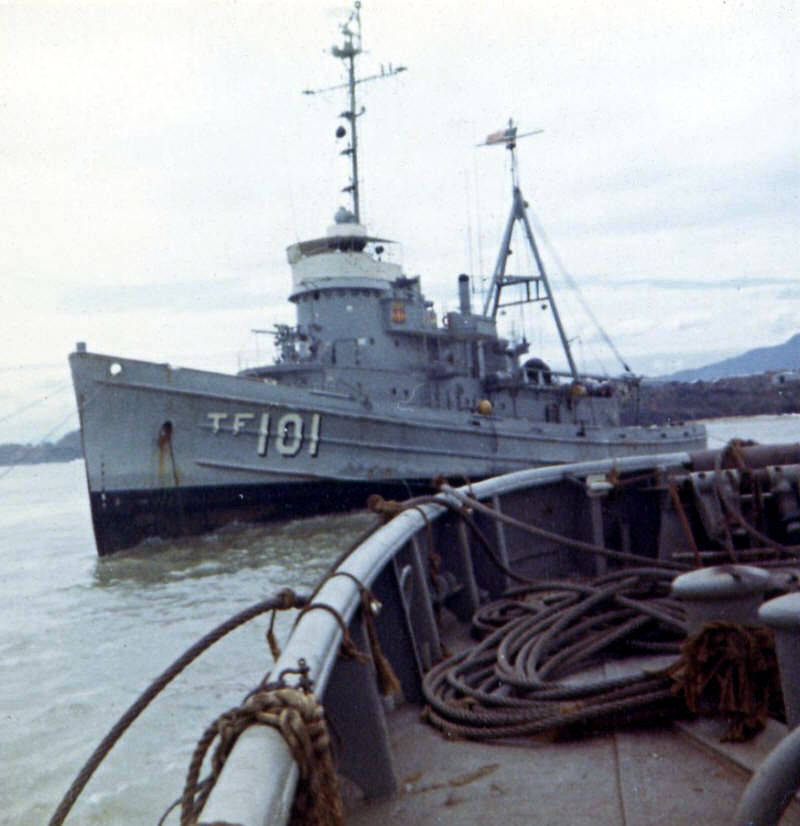
USS Cocopa in Vietnamese waters in 1967.

== Vietnam War ==
During the Vietnam War, Cocopa saw service in five campaigns: Advisory (1963), Vietnam Defense (1965), Counteroffensive Phase II (1967), Summer-Fall 1969, and Ceasefire (1972). In 1965, Cocopa hosted Detachment Charlie of Beach Jumpers Unit One, Team Twelve, operating as the "Yankee Station Special Surveillance Unit". This outfit consisted of one officer and five enlisted men, whose mission was to jam Soviet electronic intelligence trawlers monitoring U.S. operations in the Gulf of Tonkin. Team members utilized random wave jamming with noises (including bagpipe recordings) to counteract Russian SIGINT activities. Cocopa also assisted in towing, recovery and similar operations throughout her tours in Vietnam.

== Awards ==
- American Campaign Medal
- European-African-Middle Eastern Campaign Medal
- Asiatic-Pacific Campaign Medal)
- World War II Victory Medal
- Navy Occupation Service Medal
- National Defense Service Medal with star
- Korean Service Medal with one battle star
- Armed Forces Expeditionary Medal
- Vietnam Service Medal with five campaign stars
- United Nations Korea Medal
- Republic of Korea War Service Medal
- Republic of Vietnam Campaign Medal

== Mexican Navy service ==
On 30 September 1978, Cocopa was decommissioned and sold to Mexico under the Security Assistance Program, where she was recommissioned in the Mexican Navy as ARM Seri (RE-03). As of 2009 the ship remains on active duty with that force.
