= Carpet (jammer) =

Radar jamming apparatus

Carpet was an early radar jamming apparatus developed by the Allies in 1942. It was installed on strategic bombers like the B-17 from late 1943 and used alongside window to defeat German gun-laying radar. By the end of World War II, two were installed in most Eighth Air Force bombers.

The Würzburg radar was one of the most common in German use, and directed German flak batteries, so the British spent considerable effort countering the system during the war. In February 1942, a Würzburg-A system at Bruneval on the coast of France was captured by British Paratroopers in Operation Biting. Several key components were returned to the UK, which allowed the operational parameters of the system to be accurately determined. This led to the modification of existing transmitter systems to produce the "Carpet" system that broadcast noise on the frequencies used by particular Würzburg systems. Several updated versions of Carpet were introduced; Carpet II was the primary UK version while Carpet III (also known as the APT-2 Carpet) was its US-built counterpart. The system could be tuned for both spot jamming and barrage jamming.

Carpet worked as part of a system of radar countermeasures. Mandrel and Dina jammed early warning radar, screening bombers as they formed up. Leading planes dispensed Window to cloak the rest of the formation. Carpet (both set to preset frequencies, or used with the Blinker system for spot jamming) then helped protect the leading planes, as well as defeating German Window-countermeasures by forcing them to constantly retune their radar systems. The result was a serious degradation of German air defense capabilities, especially during blind bombing conditions.
