= F. N. Cook =

Frederick Norton Cook DSC (20 February 1905 – 1 August 1985), usually known as F. N. Cook was an officer of the Royal Australian Navy. Cook came to be regarded as an expert in the deployment of landing craft, following his experience with them in both the North West European theatre and the Pacific theatre. Cook achieved the rank of Captain.

In 1940, Cook was appointed as the commanding officer of HMS Tormentor, a combined forces training establishment in southern England.

During 1942 he led landing craft in the Raid on Bruneval, in German-occupied France, for which he was awarded the Distinguished Service Cross. Due to his experience with training combined forces and his success at Bruneval, Cook was recalled to Australia to command the Amphibious Training Centre at HMAS Assault (Port Stephens).
