= Sonic deception =

Deceptive use of sound in battle

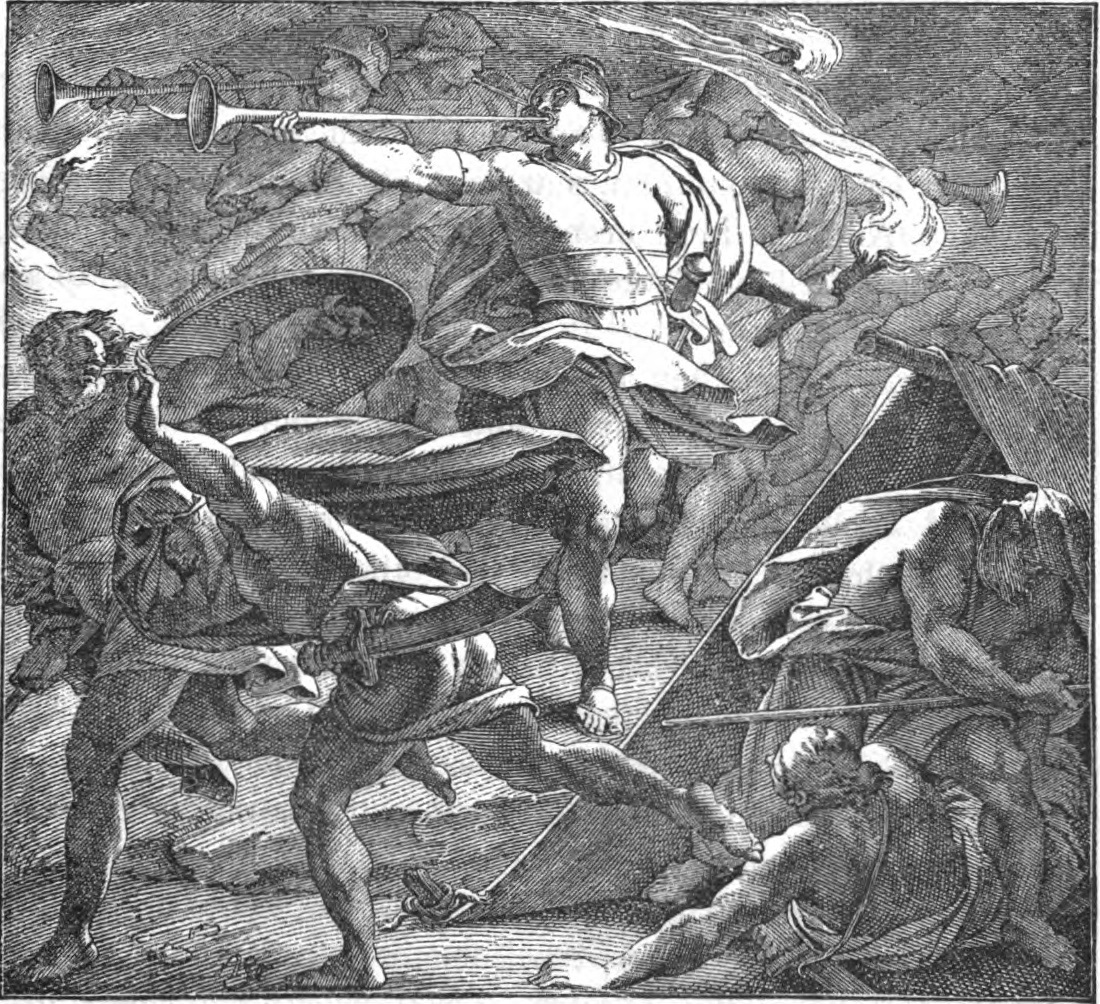
Gideon used ram horn trumpets to deceive the Midianites.

Sonic deception refers to a deception tactic on the battlefield that involves the projection of sounds to produce noises intended to mislead hearers. The recorded noises target the enemy's sound-ranging equipment, as well as the human ear. It is employed in various activities, which include vehicular movements and the construction of infrastructure and military facilities.

== Tactic ==
Sonic deception is defined as the generation, use, and distribution of sounds, which could include actual recordings and artificially generated noise that are blended to produce a sonic experience on the battlefield. The effect could lead to the confusion or distraction of the enemy. As a deception strategy, it can also be used to mislead the target.

The integration of sonic deception into larger battlefield tactics involves not only the access and use of recorded sounds and noises. These materials are used with actual equipment or personnel so that it is convincing to the enemy force. For instance, if the goal is to deceive the enemy into thinking that a sonic deception is an M1 Abrams platoon, an actual M1 tank must previously be seen driving around the area. It is assumed that the less effective visual observation is on the part of the target, the more effective the projection of the deception is. It is explained that the deception is more effective when employed "to confirm, in the mind of the enemy commander, the information which he already has received as a result of visual deception".

The deception must also be compatible with its environs. The sound of tanks, for instance, is not going to be believable in a dense swamp.

== History ==
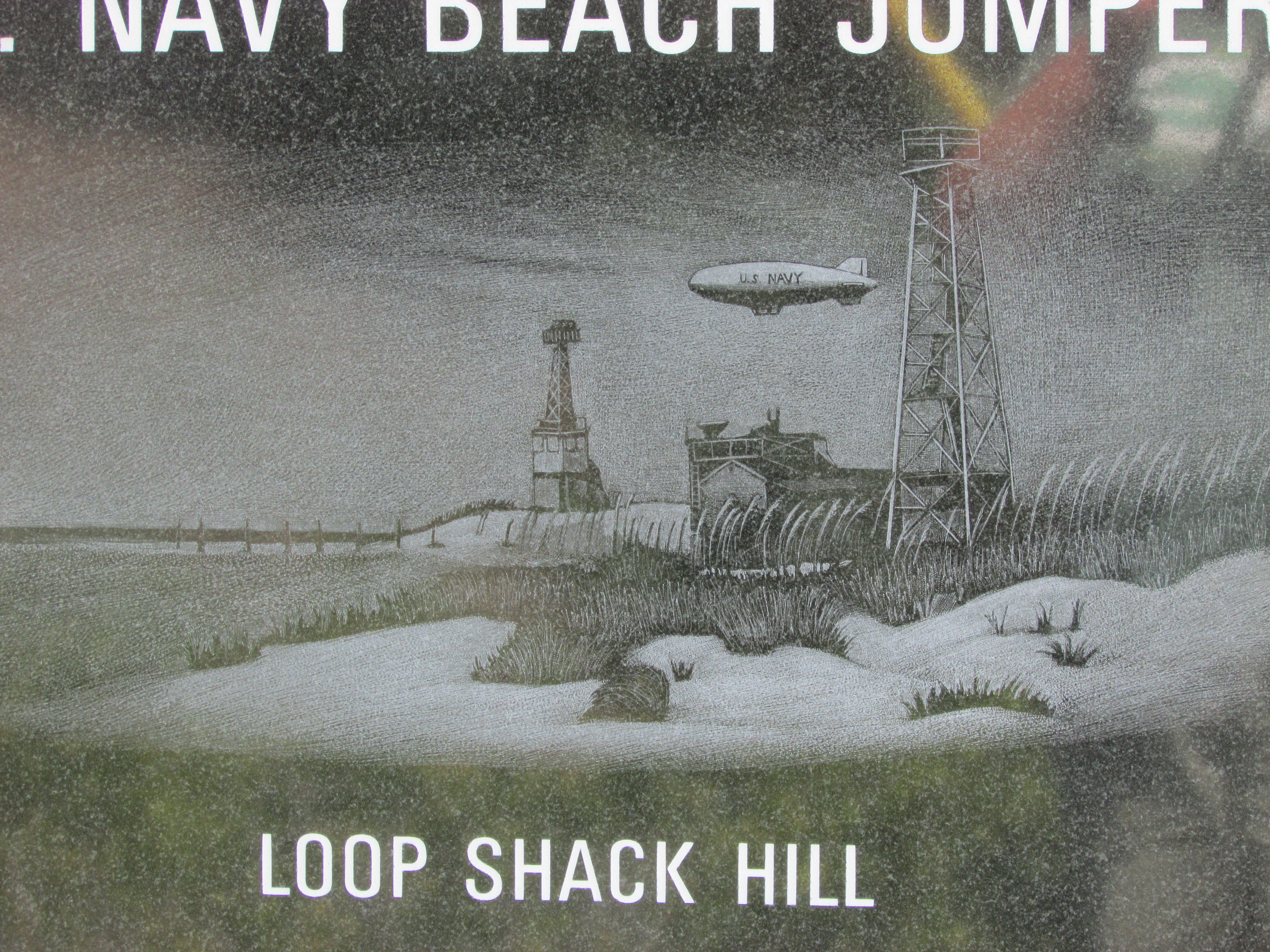
An image on the U.S. Navy Beach Jumpers' monument at Ocracoke Island.

=== Antiquity ===
Examples of sonic deception during the ancient times included the Biblical story of Gideon's assault of the Midianites (Book of Judges). The attack was carried out at night to hide his almost nonexistent force. He also ordered his soldiers to blow extra battle trumpets, each simulating one unit so that it sounded as if his army was heavily reinforced. The clash of sound and light sent the Midianites into a frenzy, hampering their capability to respond.

=== Modern period ===
Sonic deception in modern warfare emerged out of the secret Project 17:3-1, a US joint Army and Navy program tasked with researching and developing the potential military uses of sound. This initiative led to the creation of the Army Experimental Program during the Second World War. It was commanded by Lt. Col. Hilton Railey and was headquartered at Sandy Hook, New Jersey. Its initial experiments, which borrowed from the Nazis' use of sirens on civilian population, were aimed at terrorizing enemy combatants using sound. It later commissioned Bell Labs to produce and mix recordings of screaming bombs. These were recorded on three turntables and were used as part of a strategy to deceive the enemy into believing the existence of a phantom army. The Army Experimental Station also recorded various noises that were used against specific enemies. For instance, the sound of barking dogs was employed against Japanese soldiers when it was learned that a Japanese superstition associates the sound with imminent death. Some of the earliest sonic deception strategies involved the use of radio deception to mislead Germany about invasion points in Europe. The elite Beach Jumpers was formed to carry out sonic deception operations at sea. For example, they effectively diverted the attention of the Germans away from the Allied true invasion point by creating sonic deception off Cape San Marco during Operation HUSKY.

Sonic deception was also widely used by the Soviet Union as part of its own military deception doctrine. During the course of the 1939 Battles of Khalkhin Gol against Japan, Georgy Zhukov ordered the broadcasting of the noise of pile-drivers to create the impression that the Red Army was conducting defensive works. During the 1942 First Rzhev–Sychyovka Offensive Operation Zhukov once again employed large scale deception measures. Four Soviet deception (maskirovka) companies built 833 dummy tanks, guns and other equipment, later simulating its unloading at a railhead at Myatlevo. The deception companies then communicated false radio traffic to the Front headquarters, while simulating army sized units that were supposedly preparing an offensive in the Yukhnov area. The simulated units drew fire from the Luftwaffe and prompted the relocation of four German divisions to the Yukhnov area. This deception facilitated a Soviet breakthrough at another section of the front, with the 20th and 31st Armies advancing 40 kilometres (25 mi) in two days.

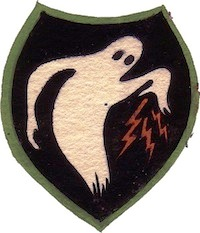
The Ghost Army insignia.

In the European theater of the war, sonic deception was used in an elaborate ruse to fool the Germans. It involved the so-called Ghost Army, a campaign staged by the 23rd Headquarters Special Troops, an elite force that specialized in tactical deception. It employed inflatable tanks, rubber airplanes, and costumes to stage more than twenty battlefield deceptions in France and Germany. Another example involved the first part of Operation 11th Panzer Division, which used sonic and visual elements. The 23rd Headquarters Special Troops deployed three tank battalions at Grevenmacher and Wormeldingen while two dummy field artillery batteries were staged at Saarlautern. Sonic deception was employed in these cases to support the illusions that projected an omnipresent army. It included prerecorded soundtracks of armored and infantry units, which were then played using amplifiers and speakers that were so powerful they could be heard within 15 miles.

The lack of noise is also considered a sonic deception tactic. This is demonstrated in the case of radio silence, which often denotes an impending attack. The strategy employs silences in areas where the enemy is expected to send troops so that activities (e.g. troop movements) can be carried out elsewhere.
