= HMS Tormentor (shore establishment) =

WWII training establishment

- Warsash, Hampshire
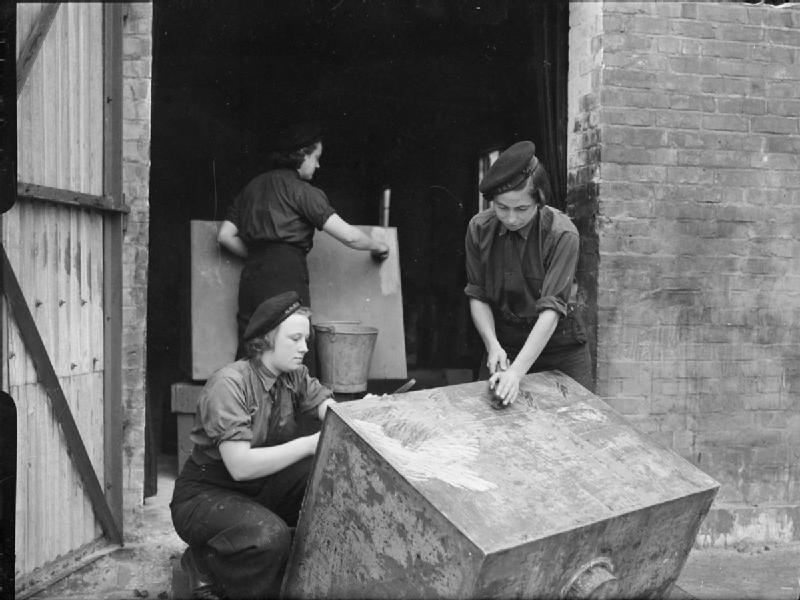
- Women's Royal Naval Service personnel at HMS Tormentor

Site information
- Type: Combined Operations Base
- Controlled by: United Kingdom

Location
- HMS Tormentor
- Coordinates: 50.845°N 1.303°W

Site history
- In use: July 1940 – May 1946

Garrison information
- Garrison: Royal Navy

HMS Tormentor was a shore establishment of the British Royal Navy during World War II, based near Warsash, on the River Hamble.

== Service history ==
The area around Warsash on the Hamble had been the site of earlier Royal Navy use when part of the shore was used as a training site for boys. This included construction of a pier for the Admiralty built in 1913. The pier onto the Hamble was later rebuilt in concrete in 1938. Following the outbreak of World War II, the Royal Navy requisitioned the remaining part of the grounds and buildings located on the shore of the River Hamble just south of Warsash village. This included the old Coast Guard House and RAF wireless station at Warsash, as well as the home of the Household Brigade Yacht Club. In July 1940, HMS Tormentor was officially commissioned as a combined operations base. The purpose of the base was the training of landing craft crews and British Commandos. As well as serving as a training establishment, the site also served as a base for cross-channel raids.

From 1940 until 1942, the establishment was under the command of F. N. Cook, DSC, a Commander in the Royal Australian Navy.

In 1942, the Southampton School of Navigation was relocated to the Warsash site and after the war, the RN establishment was decommissioned with the campus eventually becoming the Warsash Maritime School.

Douglas Fairbanks Jr. undertook intensive training at HMS Tormentor in 1942, which provided some lessons in tactics that would eventually assist his founding of the US Beach Jumpers.

On 13 August 1942, Major Herbert Hasler and Captain J. D. Stewart visited HMS Tormentor to attend a demonstration of fast motorboat training, in preparation for Operation Frankton.

In 1944, Patricia Knatchbull, Countess Mountbatten, was serving as a signals rating on the base.
