= Chaff (countermeasure) =

Radar countermeasure

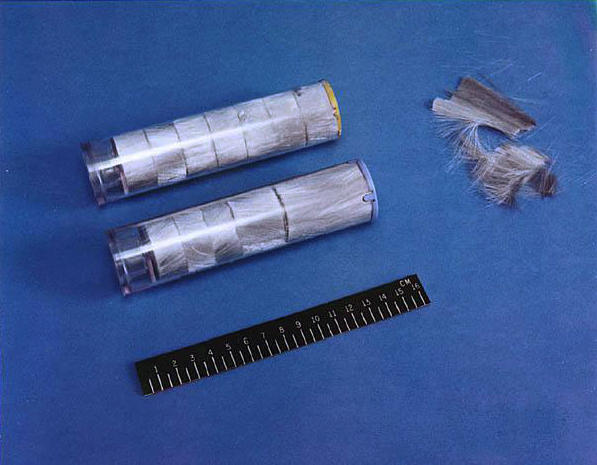
Modern US Navy RR-144 (top) and RR-129 (bottom) chaff countermeasures and containers. Note how the strips of the RR-129 chaff (bottom) are of different widths, while those of the RR-144 (top) are all the same width. The RR-144 is designed to prevent interference with civil ATC radar systems.

Chaff, originally called Window or Düppel, is a radar countermeasure involving the dispersal of thin strips of aluminium, metallized glass fiber, or plastic. Dispersed chaff produces a large radar cross section intended to blind or disrupt radar systems.

Modern military forces use chaff to distract active radar homing missiles from their targets. Military aircraft and warships can be equipped with chaff dispensing systems for self-defense. During its midcourse phase, an intercontinental ballistic missile may release chaff along with its other penetration aids.

Contemporary radar systems can distinguish chaff from legitimate targets by measuring the Doppler effect; chaff quickly loses speed after leaving an aircraft, and the resulting shift in wavelength of the radar return can be measured. To counter this, a chaff cloud can be illuminated by the defending vehicle with a doppler-corrected frequency. This is known as JAFF (jammer plus chaff) or CHILL (chaff-illuminated).

== Second World War ==
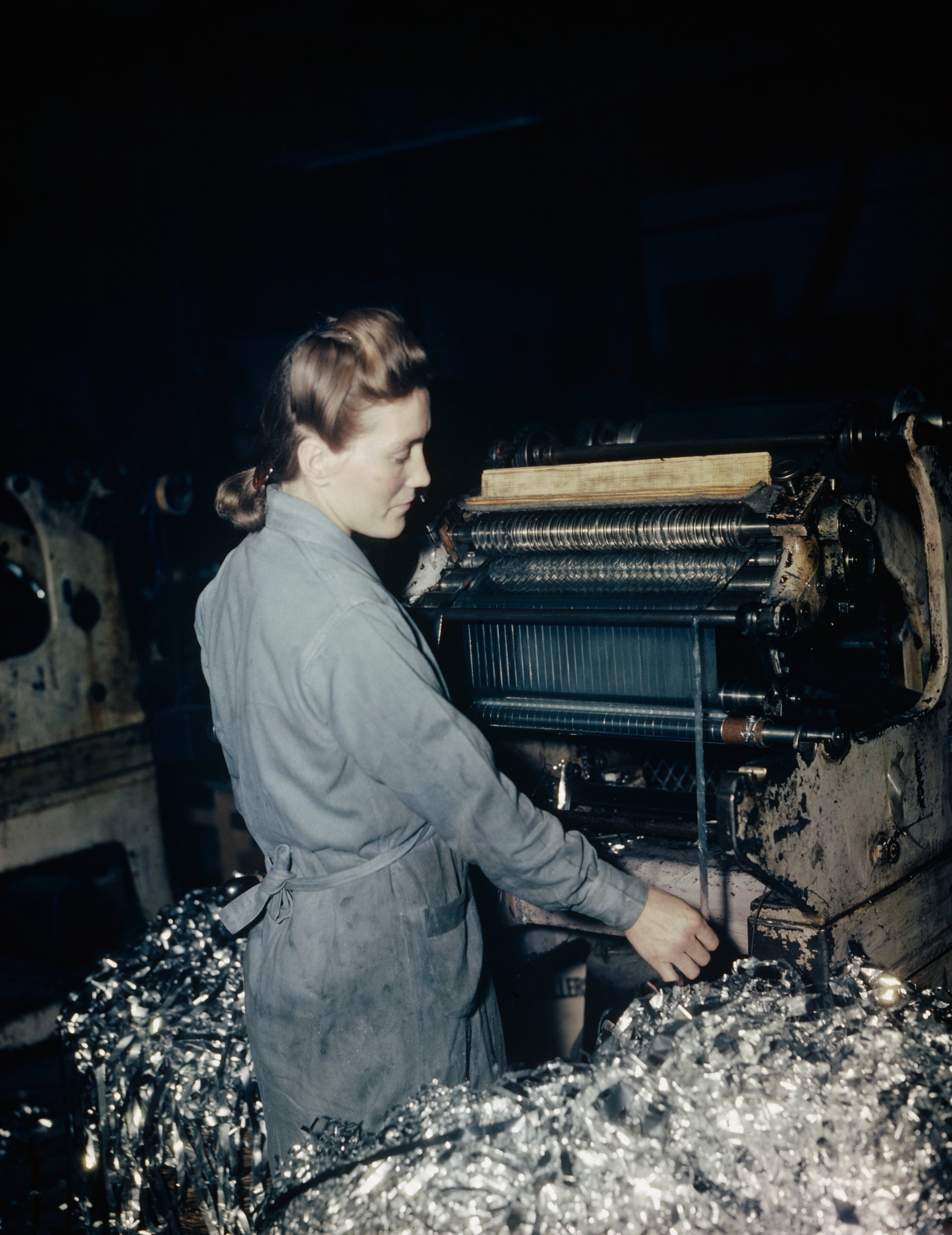
A factory worker producing chaff during World War II

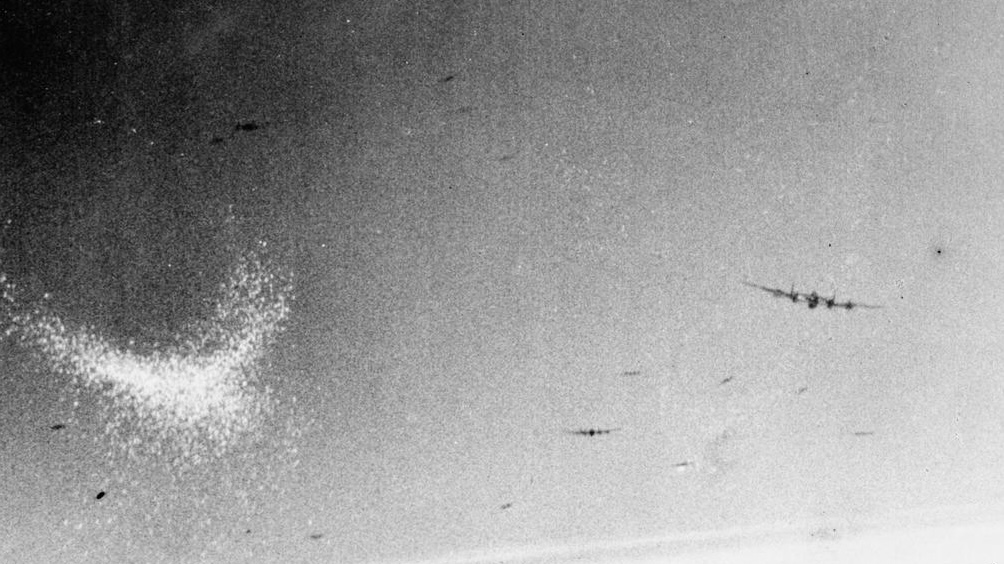
A Lancaster dropping chaff (the crescent-shaped white cloud on the left of the picture) over Essen during a thousand-bomber raid

The idea of using chaff developed independently in the United Kingdom, Germany, the United States and Japan. In 1937, British researcher Gerald Touch, while working with Robert Watson-Watt on radar, suggested that lengths of wire suspended from balloons or parachutes might overwhelm a radar system with false echoes and R. V. Jones had suggested that pieces of metal foil falling through the air might do the same. In early 1942, Telecommunications Research Establishment (TRE) researcher Joan Curran investigated the idea and came up with a scheme for dumping packets of aluminium strips from aircraft to generate a cloud of false echoes. An early idea was to use sheets the size of a notebook page; these would be printed so they would also serve as propaganda leaflets. It was found that the most effective version was strips of black paper backed with aluminium foil, exactly 27 cm × 2 cm (10.63 in × 0.79 in) and packed into bundles each weighing 1 pound (0.45 kg). The head of the TRE, A. P. Rowe, code-named the device "Window". In Germany, similar research had led to the development of Düppel. The German code name came from the estate where the first German tests with chaff took place, circa 1942. Once the British had passed the idea to the US via the Tizard Mission, Fred Whipple developed a system for dispensing strips for the USAAF, but it is not known if this was ever used.

The systems used the same concept of small aluminium strips (or wires) cut to a half of the target radar's wavelength. When hit by the radar, such lengths of metal resonate and re-radiate the signal. Opposing defences would find it almost impossible to distinguish the aircraft from the echoes caused by the chaff. Other radar-confusing techniques included airborne jamming devices codenamed Mandrel, Piperack, Jostle and Carpet. Mandrel was an airborne jammer targeted at the German Freya radars, while Carpet targeted the gun-laying Würzburg radar. Ignorance about the extent of knowledge of the principle in the opposing air force led planners to judge that it was too dangerous to use, since the opponent could duplicate it. The British government's leading scientific adviser, Professor Lindemann, pointed out that if the Royal Air Force (RAF) used it against the Germans, the Luftwaffe would quickly copy it and could launch a new Blitz. This caused concern in RAF Fighter Command and Anti-Aircraft Command, who managed to suppress the use of Window until July 1943. It was felt that the new generation of centimetric radars available to Fighter Command would cope with Luftwaffe retaliation.

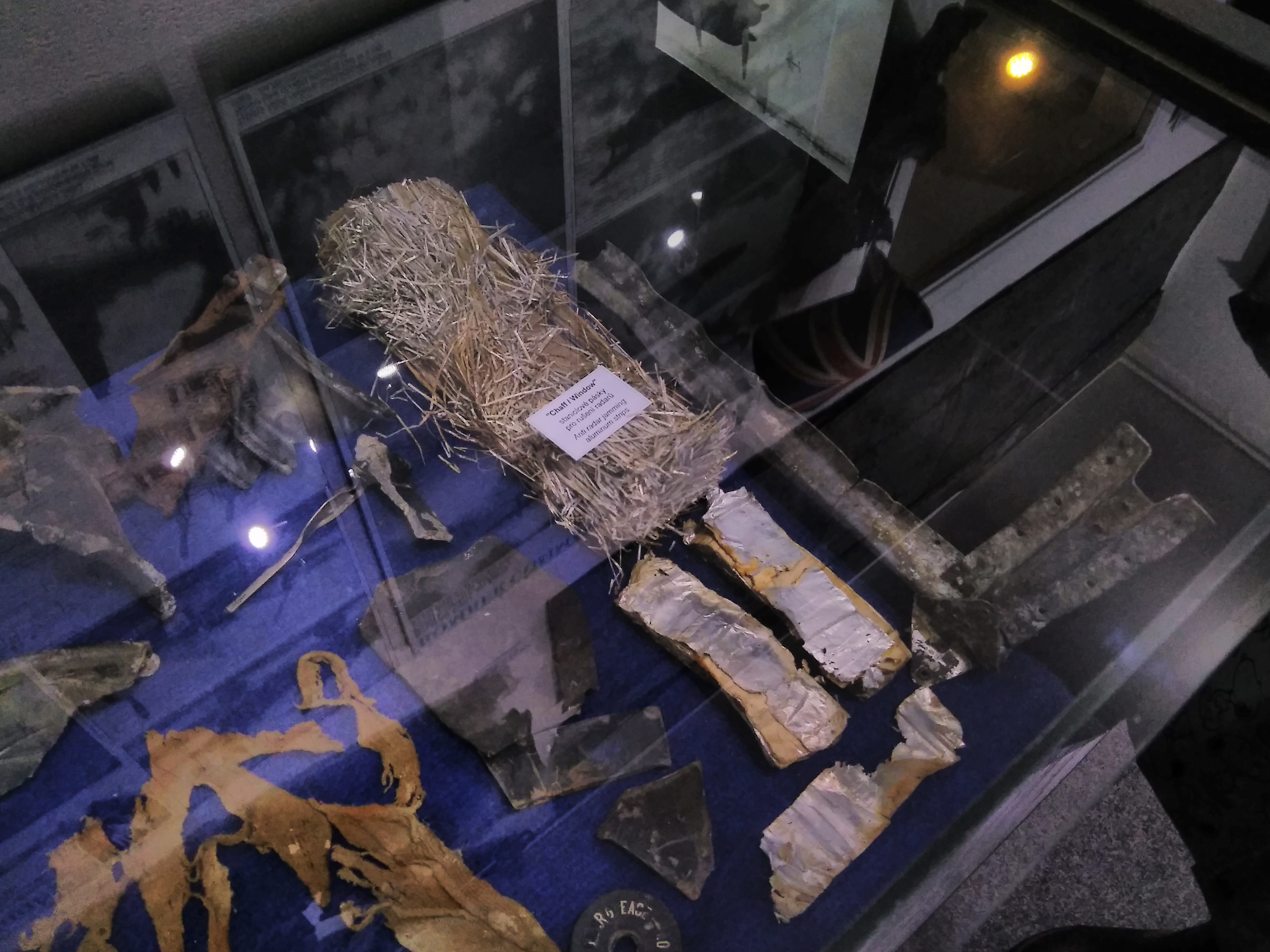
Two forms of RAF "Window" radar countermeasure: chopped aluminium wire and paper backed with aluminium foil

Examination of the Würzburg radar equipment brought back to the UK during Operation Biting (February 1942) and subsequent reconnaissance revealed to the British that all German radars were operating in no more than three frequency ranges, making them prone to jamming. Arthur Travers "Bomber" Harris, Commander-in-Chief (C-in-C) of RAF Bomber Command, finally got approval to use Window as part of Operation Gomorrah, the week long bombing campaign against Hamburg. The first aircrew trained to use Window were in 76 Squadron. Twenty-four crews were briefed on how to drop the bundles of aluminised-paper strips (treated-paper was used to minimise the weight and to maximise the time that the strips would remain in the air, prolonging the effect), one every minute through the flare chute, using a stopwatch to time them. The results proved spectacular. The radar-guided master searchlights wandered aimlessly across the sky. The anti-aircraft guns fired randomly or not at all and the night fighters, their radar displays swamped with false echoes, utterly failed to find the bomber stream. For over a week, Allied attacks devastated a vast area of Hamburg, resulting in more than 40,000 civilian deaths, with the loss of only 12 out of the 791 bombers on the first night. Squadrons quickly had special chutes fitted to their bombers to make chaff deployment even easier. Seeing this as a development that made it safer to go on operations, many crews got in as many trips as they could before the Germans found a counter-countermeasure.

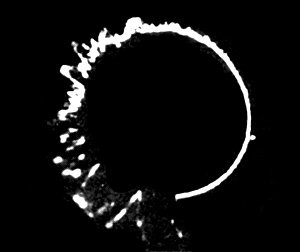
The effect of chaff on the display of a Würzburg Riese radar. The effect of jamming appears in the left "jagged" half of the circular ring, contrasting with the normal "smooth" (unjammed) display on the right half of the circle with a real target at the 3 o'clock position – on the jammed left side, the real target "blip" would have been indistinguishable from the jamming.

Although the metal strips puzzled the German civilians at first, German scientists knew exactly what they were–Düppel—but had refrained from using it for the same reasons as Lindemann had pointed out to the British. For over a year the curious situation arose where both sides of the conflict knew how to use chaff to jam the other side's radar but had refrained from doing so for fear of their opponent replying in kind. Window rendered the ground-controlled Himmelbett (canopy bed) fighters of the Kammhuber Line unable to track their targets in the night sky and rendered the early UHF-band B/C and C-1 versions of the airborne intercept Lichtenstein radar (following the capture of a Junkers Ju 88R-1 night fighter by the British in May 1943 equipped with it) useless, blinding radar-guided guns and spotlights dependent on the ground-based radar. Oberst Hajo Herrmann developed Wilde Sau (Wild Boar) to cope with the lack of accurate ground guidance and led to the formation of three new fighter wings to use the tactic, numbered JG 300, JG 301 and JG 302. Ground operators would radio-direct single-seat fighters and night fighters to areas where the concentrations of chaff were greatest (which would indicate the source of the chaff) for the fighter pilots to see targets, often against the illumination from fires and searchlights below. A few of the single-seat fighters had the FuG 350 Naxos device to detect H2S radar (the first airborne, ground scanning radar system) emissions from the bombers.

Six weeks after the Hamburg raid, the Luftwaffe used Düppel in 80 cm × 1.9 cm (31.50 in × 0.75 in) lengths during a raid on the night of 7/8 October 1943. In raids in 1943 and the "mini-blitz" of Operation Steinbock between February and May 1944, Düppel allowed German bombers again to attempt operations over London. Although theoretically effective, the small number of bombers, notably in relation to the large RAF night-fighter force, doomed the effort from the start. The British fighters were able to go aloft in large numbers and often found the German bombers in spite of Düppel. The Germans obtained better results during the air raid on Bari in Italy, on 2 December 1943, when Allied radars were deceived by the use of Düppel.

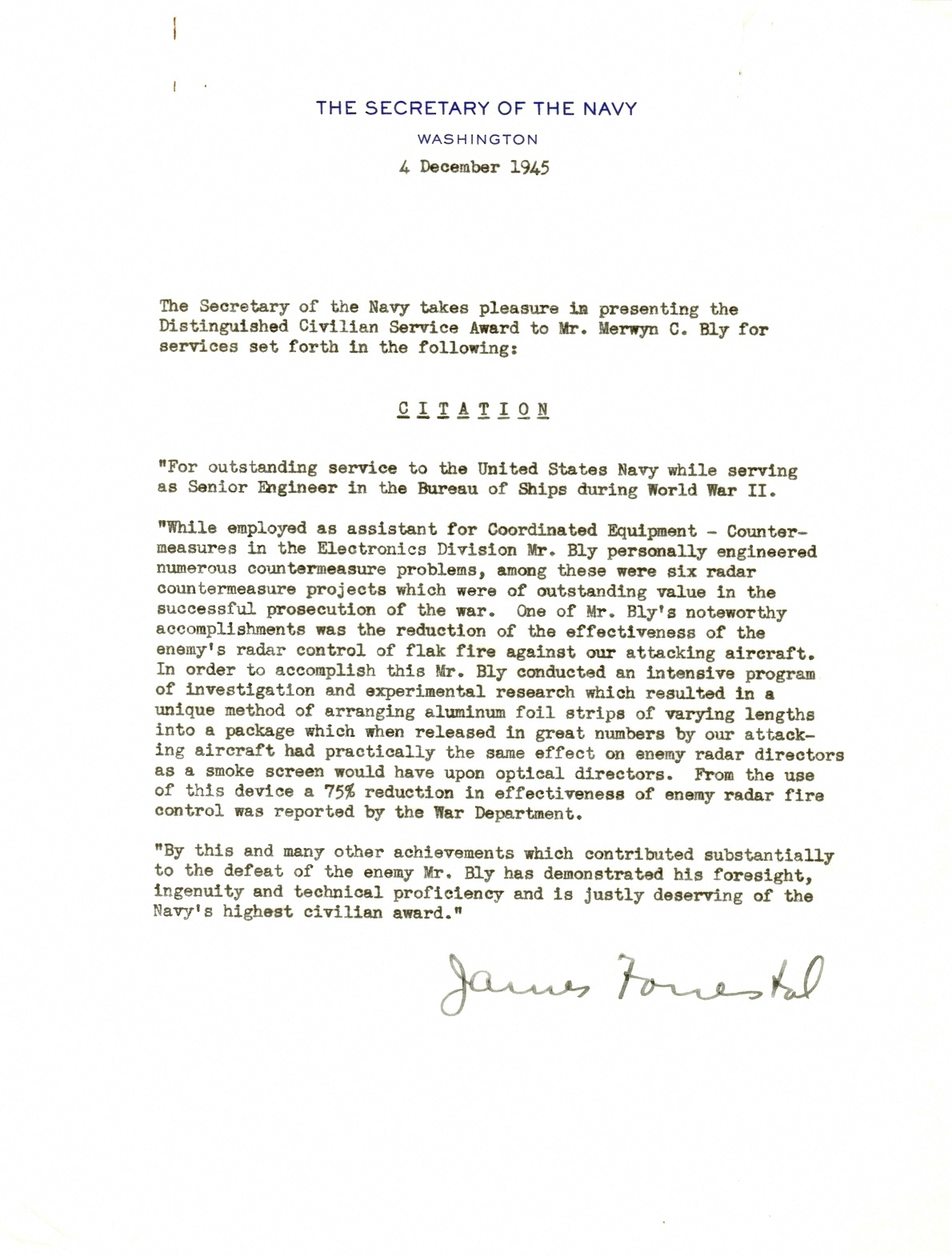
Letter from Secretary of the Navy James Forrestal to Merwyn Bly

Following the British discovery of it in 1942 by Joan Curran, chaff in the United States was co-invented by astronomer Fred Whipple and Navy engineer Merwyn Bly. Whipple proposed the idea to the Air Force he was working with at the time. Early tests failed as the foil strips stuck together and fell as clumps to little or no effect. Bly solved this by designing a cartridge that forced the strips to rub against it as they were expelled, gaining an electrostatic charge. Since the strips all had a similar charge they repelled each other, enabling the full countermeasure effect. After the war, Bly received the Navy Distinguished Civilian Service Award for his work.

In the Pacific Theatre, Navy Lieutenant Commander Sudo Hajime invented a Japanese version called Giman-shi, or "deceiving paper". It was first used with some success in mid 1943, during night battles over the Solomon Islands. Competing demands for the scarce aluminum necessary for its manufacture limited its use. On February 21, 1945, during the Battle of Iwo Jima, Giman-shi was successfully used prior to a Kamikaze attack on the USS Saratoga.

== Falklands War ==
British warships in the Falklands War (1982) made heavy use of chaff.

During this war, British Sea Harrier aircraft lacked their conventional chaff-dispensing mechanism. Therefore, Royal Navy engineers designed an improvised delivery system of welding rods, split pins and string, which allowed six packets of chaff to be stored in the airbrake well and be deployed in flight. It was often referred to as the "Heath Robinson chaff modification", due to its complexity.

== Usage ==
Although chaff produces large amounts of scattered reflections potentially clogging a radar display it can be filtered through multiple methods such as tracking its altitude and through the doppler effect. Radar can make use of the doppler effect to distinguish between chaff and target aircraft which are fast moving. The doppler effect only occurs for the component of velocity parallel to the radar beam. To overcome this, large amounts of chaff are deployed and then the aircraft will turn so that it moves predominantly perpendicular to the radar source. It may also rotate to minimize its cross section exposed to the radar beam. This leads to aircraft being more difficult to separate from the effectively stationary chaff and is known as "notching" as radar typically incorporate a notch of low sensitivity to frequencies associated with low velocity. The effect is likely to be momentary against modern radar systems but can be prolonged by the use of Chill and Jaff as described below. Another method described by a meteorological journal describes the use of the chaff's altitude and descent as another method of removing large clusters of chaff from clogging radar readings. This method, however, is unreliable due to potential weather conditions, so it is most optimally used during clear skies.

== JAFF and CHILL ==
One of the important qualities of chaff is that it is lightweight, allowing large amounts to be carried. As a result, after release it quickly loses any forward speed it had from the aircraft or rocket launcher, and then begins to fall slowly to the ground. From the viewpoint of an enemy radar, the chaff quickly decays to zero velocity. Modern radars use the Doppler effect to measure the line-of-sight velocity of objects, and can thus distinguish chaff from an aircraft, which continues to move at high speed. This allows the radar to filter out the chaff from its display.

To counteract this filtering, the JAFF or CHILL technique has been developed. This uses an additional jammer broadcaster on the aircraft to reflect a signal off the chaff cloud that has the proper frequency to match that of the aircraft. This makes it impossible to use Doppler shift alone to filter out the chaff signal. In practice, the signal is deliberately noisy in order to present multiple false targets.

In essence, the JAFF technique is a low-cost offboard decoy, moving the jammers from the launcher platform to the decoy, and using the chaff as a reflector to provide angular separation.

== Modern chaff ==
While foil chaff is still used by certain aircraft, such as the Boeing B-52 Stratofortress bomber, this type is no longer manufactured. The chaff used by aircraft such as the Fairchild-Republic A-10 Thunderbolt II, McDonnell Douglas F-15 Eagle, General Dynamics F-16 Fighting Falcon, and McDonnell Douglas F/A-18 Hornet consists of aluminium-coated glass fibres. These fibre "dipoles" are designed to remain airborne for as long as possible, having a typical diameter of 1 mil, or 0.025 mm, and a typical length of 0.3 inches (7.6 mm) to over 2 inches (51 mm). Newer "superfine" chaff has a typical diameter of 0.7 mils (0.018 mm). The chaff is carried in tubular cartridges, which remain attached to the aircraft, each typically containing around 3 to 5 million chaff fibres. The chaff is ejected from the cartridge by a plastic piston driven by a small pyrotechnic charge.

== Types of chaff ==
Chaff countermeasures come in two main types: continuous wave (CW) chaff, used against radar-guided missiles that operate on a continuous frequency, and pulsed chaff, used against missiles that operate on a pulsed frequency.

== Environmental and health effects ==
Little research has been conducted on the public health and environmental effects of chaff. A U.S. Department of Defense-sponsored 1998 research review stated that the "widespread environmental, human and agricultural impacts of chaff as currently used in training are negligible and far less than those from other man-made emissions."

== See also ==
- Anti-ballistic missile
- Countermeasure
- Infrared countermeasure
- Electronic countermeasure
- Flare (countermeasure)
- SRBOC (Super Rapid-Blooming Offboard Chaff), a shipboard chaff system

== Sources ==
- Goebel, Greg. The Wizard War: WW2 & The Origins Of Radar v.2.0.2, retrieved 2021-05-26
- Jones, R. V. (1978). Most Secret War: British Scientific Intelligence 1939–1945. London: Hamish Hamilton. ISBN 0-241-89746-7.
- Neri, Filippo (2006). Introduction to Electronic Defense Systems. SciTech Publishing. ISBN 978-1-63-081534-9.
