= HMAS Assault =

Australian navy base, 1942–1945

- Nelson Bay, New South Wales in Australia
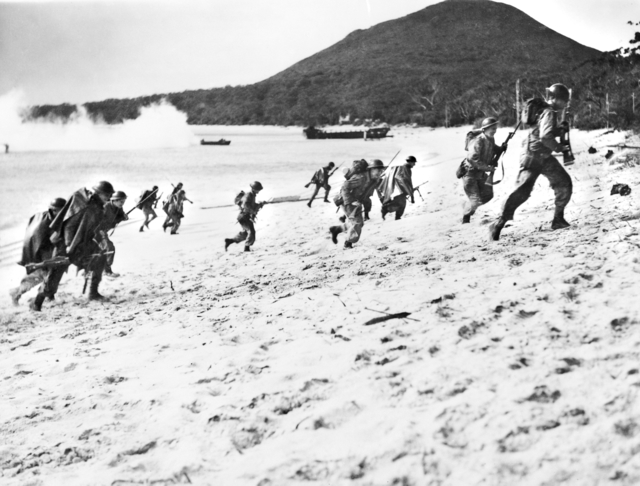
- Troops and landing craft crews training at HMAS Assault during World War II

Site information
- Type: Training centre
- Owner: Port Stephens Society of the Arts
- Operator: Royal Australian Navy (1942–45); Royal Navy (1945–49); Commonwealth Employment Service (1949–53)

Location
- Location in New South Wales
- Coordinates: 32°42′57″S 152°09′15″E

Site history
- Built: September 1942
- In use: 1 September 1942 – April 1945
- Fate: Decommissioned; now Port Stephens Community Arts Centre

HMAS Assault is a former Royal Australian Navy (RAN) training centre that was in use during World War II, located at Nelson Bay in the Mid North Coast region of New South Wales, Australia.

== Formation and history ==
In June 1942, Royal Navy Commander F. N. Cook, the former commander of the Combined Operations Centre – HMS Tormenter – who was on loan to the RAN to help establish an Australian combined operations school, identified Port Stephens as the ideal location to establish a RAN training base for amphibious landings. On 9 August, General Douglas MacArthur ordered the establishment of the Joint Overseas Operational Training School (JOOTS) at Port Stephens. While the base was under construction, HMAS Westralia was assigned to the area as an accommodation ship, with HMAS Ping Wo serving as a tender.

The stone frigate HMAS Assault was commissioned on 1 September 1942; Assault was initially operated from Westralia, but moved ashore on 10 December 1942. The base's main purpose was to train boat crews for landing craft, beach commandos to prepare beaches and co-ordinate landings on the shore, and signals sections to facilitate communications between ships and land-based forces. Training at Assault was initially hampered by the lack of LCVP and LCM craft available, with the base forced to use folding boats towed by launches and lighters to simulate landing craft, and HMAS Koopa, a requisitioned pleasure boat, as an assault transport. By March 1943, enough landing craft had been manufactured in Australia and delivered from the United States to allow for full-scale landing exercises. For administrative purposes, landing and shore personnel trained at Assault were considered to be attached to the base, not the ships that they were embarked in.

HMAS Assault Memorial at Shoal Bay

The Naval Training Center at Assault was used to train landing craft crews, beach parties and signal teams. Between September 1942 and October 1943 the following Naval personnel were trained at HMAS Assault:

- 100 officers
- 100 coxswains
- 120 beach commanders
- 453 boat crews
- 250 stokers
- 40 signalmen

The JOOTS section of Assault was closed on 1 October 1943, with all joint amphibious warfare training consolidated at the Army facility at Toorbul Point, Queensland. The RAN continued training its own boat and beach crews at Assault until August 1944, when the base was decommissioned and reduced to a caretaker establishment. In April 1945, the base was given to the Royal Navy, who used it as a Commando Depot for the Royal Marines units attached to the British Pacific Fleet.

Assault's sickbay was used as migrant accommodation from 1949 to 1953. It was opened as a small hospital in 1956, then closed in 1981. On 10 August 1981 the buildings were handed over to the Port Stephens Society of the Arts and are now used as the Port Stephens Community Arts Centre.

== See also ==
- List of former Royal Australian Navy bases
