= Ronald D. McLaurin =

American essayist and publisher (1945–1995)

Ronald D. McLaurin (8 October 1945 – 12 June 1995) was an essayist and American publisher who explored the themes of propaganda, misinformation, and subversion.

== Published works ==
- The Middle East in Soviet Policy, Lexington Books, ISBN 0669982857, (1975)
- Foreign Policy Making in the Middle East: Domestic Influences on Policy in Egypt, Iraq, Israel and Syria, ISBN 978-0275650100, (1977)
- Political Role of Minorities in the Middle East, Praeger Publishers Inc., ISBN 978-0030525964, (1979)
- Beyond Camp David: Emerging Alignments and Leaders in the Middle East, with Paul A. Jureidini, ISBN 9780815622352, (1981)
- Military Propaganda: Psychological Warfare and Operations, Praeger Publishers, ISBN 978-0275908591, (1982)
- The Battle of Zahle, (1986)
- The Battle of Tyre, (1987)
- Modern Experience in City Combat, PN, ASIN: B00CJJCOWC, (1987)
- Alliance Under Tension: The Evolution of South Korean-U.S. Relations, with Manwoo Lee and Chung-In Moon, Westview Press, ISBN 978-0813308357, (1988)
- The Battle of Sidon, (1989)
- The Dilemma of Third World Defense Industry: Supplier or Recipient Control Autonomy with Baek Kwang-Il, Westview Press, ISBN 978-0813305820, (1989)
- Military strength in urban anti-terrorism, US Army Human Engineering Laboratory, (1989)
- The United States and the defense of the Pacific, with Chung-in Moon, Kyungnam University Press, ISBN 9780813379173, (1989)
