= Electronics Technology and Devices Laboratory =

Defunct research facility of the United States Army

Coordinates: 40.315°N 74.043°W

- Fort Monmouth, New Jersey in United States
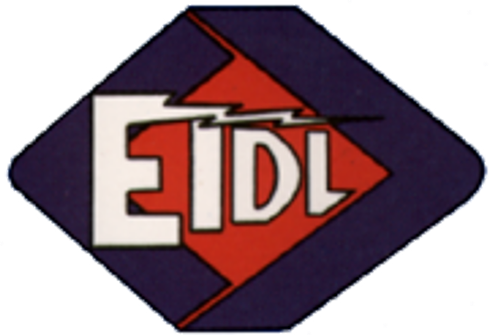
- Electronics Technology and Devices Laboratory – Logo

Site information
- Type: Military research laboratory
- Owner: Department of Defense
- Operator: U.S. Army
- Controlled by: Army Materiel Command
- Condition: Closed

Site history
- Built: 1971

The Electronics Technology and Devices Laboratory (ETDL) was a research facility under the U.S. Army Materiel Command that specialized in developing and integrating critical electronic technologies, from high frequency devices to tactical power sources, into Army systems. Located at Fort Monmouth, New Jersey, ETDL served as the U.S. Army’s central laboratory for electronics research from 1971 to 1992. In 1992, ETDL was disestablished, and the majority of its operations and personnel were incorporated into the newly created U.S. Army Research Laboratory (ARL).

== History ==
The Electronics Technology and Devices Laboratory was one of the many laboratories that materialized following the dissolution of the Signal Corps Laboratories (SCL). Throughout its history, the SCL was given various different names as it underwent numerous restructuring efforts by the U.S. Army. By the early 1950s, the SCL was known as the Signal Corps Engineering Laboratories before it was redesignated as the U.S. Army Signal Corps Research and Development Laboratory (ASCRDL) in 1958. That same year, the Institute for Exploratory Research was created to consolidate the ASCRDL's internal research efforts. In 1962, a major Army restructuring program caused the ASCRDL to become a subordinate element of the U.S. Army Electronics Command (ECOM) known as the U.S. Army Electronics Research and Development Laboratory. The lab was again renamed to the U.S. Army Electronics Laboratories in 1964 only to completely dissolve during the Army reorganization of 1965.

On June 1, 1965, the U.S. Army Electronics Command (ECOM), a subordinate element of the U.S. Army Materiel Command (AMC), made the decision to discontinue the operations of the U.S. Army Electronics Laboratories, which had adopted the duties of the Signal Corps Laboratories. The U.S. Army Electronics Laboratories was subsequently divided into six separate laboratories: the Electronic Components Laboratory, the Communications/ADP Laboratory, the Atmospheric Sciences Laboratory, the Electronic Warfare Laboratory (part of which later became the Vulnerability Assessment Laboratory), the Avionics Laboratory, and the Combat Surveillance and Target Acquisition Laboratory. In 1971, the Electronic Components Laboratory merged with the Institute for Exploratory Research to form the Electronics Technology and Devices Laboratory. Its operations took place at the Albert J. Myer Center, commonly referred to as the Hexagon Building, at Fort Monmouth in New Jersey.

During the 1980s, ETDL acted as the lead laboratory for the Army for two significant technology programs within the Department of Defense (DoD): The Very High Speed Integrated Circuit (VHSIC) Program and the Microwave and Millimeter Wave Monolithic Integrated Circuits (MIMIC) Program. The VHSIC Program, which began in March 1980 and ended in September 1990, advanced the production of state-of-the-art integrated circuit (IC) technology for military applications. This program served to accelerate the process of integrating new IC technology into weapon systems and close the growing disparity between commercial and military microelectronic products. The MIMIC Program, which took place from 1987 to 1995, advanced the development of state-of-the-art microwave and millimeter-wave monolithic devices for military applications. This program focused on creating the infrastructure necessary for the DoD to pursue and realize innovations in IC technology that reduce the size and cost of military electronics used in smart munitions while improving their power and reliability. While the VHSIC Program centered on the development of silicon ICs, the MIMIC Program centered on the development of gallium arsenide ICs.

Both programs emphasized the value of the IC, which quickly became a core component for signal processing in modern electronic systems. Instead of having many discrete semiconductor components make up a circuit, the IC embedded these components on a single semiconductor chip, which enabled significant reductions in size, weight, and cost. Having recognized the IC as a powerful force multiplier for national defense, the DoD invested heavily in programs that reinforced the military’s access to new IC designs and innovations.

=== VHSIC Program ===
The U.S. government, as an early proponent of integrated circuits, originally dominated the user market during the 1960s as the leading global force behind their research and development. The government’s strong ties to the emerging IC manufacturing industry oriented much of the IC technology to suit the unique needs and requirements of the military. During the 1970s, however, commercial applications of IC technology generated so much business that the commercial market quickly overshadowed the federal market. As a result, IC manufacturers began tailoring their technology to conform to commercial interest instead of military specifications. By 1978, commercial applications represented more than 90 percent of the total IC market sales, and the DoD’s access to the latest IC designs and advancements had significantly eroded. The lengthy process of qualifying commercial IC technology further delayed their integration into military systems, which resulted in a gap between the commercial introduction of new innovations and their appearance in DoD systems. The semiconductor industry introduced new IC designs and production techniques at such a fast rate that electronic components in some military systems, as well as the facilities that produced them, faced the danger of early obsolescence. Unable to keep pace with the technology’s rapid evolution in the commercial sector, the DoD was left with military technology that relied on outdated electronic subsystems. By 1980, analysts estimated that the semiconductor technology in military systems was lagging behind those in commercial systems by at least 10 years.

The VHSIC Program served to not only address the deficiencies present in the DoD related to IC procurement and integration but also close the 10-year gap between commercial and military microelectronic systems. In service of these goals, the VHSIC Program engaged in the development of new materials, new circuit design concepts, advanced fabrication processes, new manufacturing equipment, higher levels of radiation hardening, and new data interface standards and specifications. Importantly, the program placed a high priority on restoring the capability of the U.S. semiconductor industry to deliver the most advanced military ICs to the DoD. The VHSIC Program, coordinating with a high degree of cooperation among the U.S. Army, U.S. Navy, and U.S. Air Force, facilitated partnerships with leaders in the semiconductor industry from 1980 to 1990 to design, manufacture, and implement highly advanced silicon ICs in military systems. Given the urgency of the situation, the program was labeled as one of the highest priority technology programs in the DoD at the time.

ETDL served as the Army’s lead laboratory and principal manager for the VHSIC Program. One of its main responsibilities pertained to in-house testing and evaluation of VHSIC technology. During the program, six prime contractors—Honeywell, Inc., Texas Instruments, Inc., TRW Inc., IBM Corporation, Hughes Aircraft Company, and Westinghouse Electric Corporation—developed advanced microchip components to upgrade the DoD’s weapon systems. At ETDL, researchers conducted functional, parametric, and electrical performance verification tests on these devices to verify performance and identify hidden issues. The resulting microchips demonstrated a computational rate that was 10 times faster than that of commercial microcircuits at the time.

Evaluations of VHSIC Devices by the Electronics Technology and Devices Laboratory
Device	Contractor	Testing Period	Results
Correlator	Hughes	May 1984 to December 1985	ETDL conducted parametric tests that verified the relevant measurements for both the correlator wafer test structures and a packaged device.
Static Random Access Memory (SRAM)	Texas Instruments	September 1984 to October 1987	ETDL and the Rome Air Development Center conducted electrical performance verification tests that eventually validated the technology’s use in the Firefinder radar systems.
Multiport Switch (MPS)	Texas Instruments	December 1984 to July 1987	ETDL and Texas Instruments conducted electrical performance tests that led to the preparation of a detailed specification in Military Drawing Format for the MPS device.
Static Random Access Memory (SRAM)	Westinghouse	August 1985 to November 1985	ETDL conducted functional and parametric tests as well as electrical performance verification tests over the full range of military temperature.
Arithmetic Element Controller (AEC)	Hughes	February 1984 to March 1989	ETDL conducted electrical performance verification, functional, and parametric tests over the full military temperature range to validate the technology’s use in the Firefinder radar systems.
Signal Processing Element (SPE)	IBM	June 1988 to December 1989	ETDL conducted tests which revealed several design and performance problems with IBM subsequently addressed.
VHSIC Bus Interface Unit (VBIU)	IBM	December 1988 to September 1989	ETDL conducted functional and parametric tests at various temperatures.

By the end of the VHSIC Program, ETDL contributed to over 46 development or fielded systems in seven mission areas. Planned implementations of VHSIC technology included applications such as the M1 tank fire control system, smart munitions, the tube-launched, optically tracked, wire-guided (TOW) Auto Tracker, the Light Helicopter Experimental (LHX), and the Firefinder radar systems. ETDL also facilitated the development of an electron beam lithography system capable of fabricating submicron patterns at a faster rate than conventional electron beam machines. This lithography system was able to produce VHSIC devices planned for smart missiles, electronic warfare technology, radar, electro-optics, and battlefield information systems.

=== MIMIC Program ===
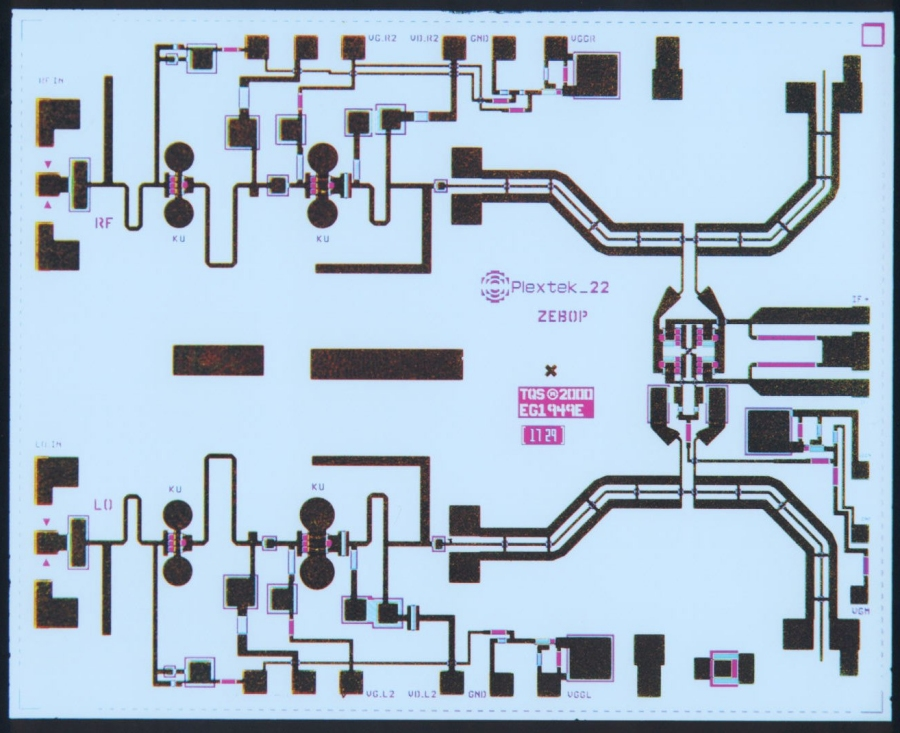
A gallium arsenide MMIC.

The initiatives behind the MIMIC Program emerged following deliberations within the DoD surrounding the production of a new missile guidance system for the Army’s Multiple Launch Rocket System Terminal Guidance Warhead program. During the early 1970s, the Ballistic Research Laboratory, with funding from the U.S. Army Missile Command (MICOM), contracted Sperry Microwave to develop a millimeter-wave homing seeker that used radar to search and track targets. By 1983, Sperry Microwave demonstrated 5-mm seeker heads but reported that the radio frequency (RF) components and the antenna assembly represented 79.9 percent of the unit production cost of the front end of the radar system. The company concluded that adopting a fully integrated RF component design approach instead of relying on discrete components for the front end would reduce the number of parts and significantly lower costs. In order to make the introduction of monolithic millimeter and microwave integrated circuits possible, however, Sperry Microwave required a DoD investment of $8 to $10 million over a 5- to 8-year period to fund new facilities, research, design tools, and manufacturing processes.

News of this unforeseen expense caused the DoD to re-examine the quality and readiness of the U.S. industrial base. At the time, the erosion of U.S. manufacturing capabilities in microelectronics and the loss of U.S. dominance in the global semiconductor marketplace prompted the DoD to heavily scrutinize the entire process behind how U.S. industry provided new technologies to the military. In 1984, MICOM conducted follow-up studies that determined the majority of companies working in the field of millimeter integrated circuits expressed little interest in the development of relevant manufacturing processes for the technology. In response, the Office of the Under Secretary of Defense for Research and Engineering established the Monolithic Millimeter and Microwave Initiative (M^{3}I) Committee in February 1985 to organize a DoD program on microwave and millimeter wave monolithic integrated circuits, or MIMICs. During its investigation, the M^{3}I Committee recognized the absence of a mature technology base for the production of MIMICs within the U.S. semiconductor industry. Reports identified gaps in the technology space and warned that the U.S. manufacturing base for MIMICs faced serious threats of foreign competition if it did not evolve soon. One report by ETDL compared the capabilities of Japanese semiconductor companies to that of American companies and determined that no single U.S. company could compete in this field, much less act as a reliable supplier of leading-edge IC technology for the DoD. The DoD soon announced the creation of the MIMIC Program to the semiconductor industry in 1986, although funding for the program officially began in 1987. In 1988, the DoD transferred responsibility of the program from the Office of the Secretary of Defense to the Defense Advanced Research Projects Agency (DARPA).

The MIMIC Program focused primarily on the advancement of gallium arsenide (GaAs) technology as well as its manufacturing processes within the semiconductor industry. As early as the 1970s, gallium arsenide attracted attention in industry as a promising alternative to silicon after GaAs semiconductor components exhibited relatively high performance levels. By the early 1980s, GaAs MMICs, or Monolithic Microwave Integrated Circuits, demonstrated attractive qualities, but their high variability in material characteristics and design across industry made their performance inconsistent and unreliable. At the time, the U.S. semiconductor industry still viewed GaAs as a research-grade material, and the fabrication of GaAs circuits took place in laboratories rather than production lines. As a result, GaAs devices faced limited automated testing capabilities, computer-aided design capabilities, and packaging options. Since the development and production of GaAs MMICs entailed considerable financial costs, most companies elected to produce discrete GaAs components to enhance hybridized microwave and millimeter-wave solid-state circuits. Even though GaAs MMICs demonstrated potential to significantly augment the capabilities of modern electronics, the lack of commercial applications greatly discouraged companies from investing in the necessary infrastructure required to increase their yield and lower their costs. The MIMIC Program prioritized the creation of infrastructure that would facilitate the transition of GaAs research and development into a manufacturable production process. Program managers operated under the belief that establishing this foundation in industry would enable the efficient, affordable, and self-sustaining production of MIMICs for military applications.

During the 1970s, ETDL was deeply involved in the research and development of microwave and millimeter-wave technology as well as their application in smart weapons. The laboratory managed a research thrust in low-cost millimeter-wave devices and nanosecond pulsers for target location and actively pursued monolithic technology based in GaAs. As a result of its familiarity and expertise in this realm, ETDL helped shape the structure of the MIMIC Program. When the program was formally established across the DoD, ETDL served as the lead laboratory for the Army. As part of the MIMIC Program, the U.S. Army, U.S. Navy, and U.S. Air Force organized and managed four large teams, each composed of several major U.S. companies, to develop the required MIMIC components for the DoD’s missile, radar, electronic warfare, and communications systems. In order to facilitate cooperation and promote a unified effort toward achieving the overarching goals, the armed services arranged the terms of the collaboration so that the industry partners shared their data, patent rights, and knowledge base with each other and combined their existing R&D fabrication processes as a baseline. ETDL managed two of the four teams as the Army lead in the MIMIC Program. The first team, led jointly by the Martin Marietta Corporation and ITT Inc., was composed of the Harris Corporation, Alpha Industries, Pacific Monolithic, and the Watkins-Johnson Company. The second team, led by TRW Inc., was composed of General Dynamics, Honeywell, and the Hittite Microwave Corporation. After ETDL became an element of the U.S. Army Research Laboratory (ARL) in 1992, management of the MIMIC Program for the Army continued in ARL through program completion in 1995.

The MIMIC Program was seen as a major success by the DoD and saw the establishment of the infrastructure and capabilities necessary to design and produce GaAs MMICs for a wide range of applications at low cost with high yield and reliability. While originally intended for military applications, the advancement of GaAs IC technology through the MIMIC Program significantly expanded the capabilities of modern electronic systems in the commercial sector. Most notably, GaAs transistors greatly impacted the development of cellular phone technology during the 1990s.

=== Closure ===
In 1992, the Electronics Technology and Devices Laboratory was among the seven Army laboratories that were consolidated to form the U.S. Army Research Laboratory following the Base Realignment and Closure (BRAC) commission in 1991. Under ARL, ETDL made up most of the Electronics and Power Sources Directorate, which eventually became part of the Physical Sciences Directorate in 1995 before migrating into the Sensors and Electron Devices Directorate in 1996.

== Research ==
The Electronics Technology and Devices Laboratory’s primary mission pertained to the development and transition of critical electronic technologies and devices into existing or future generation Army systems. As the Army’s central laboratory for electronics research, ETDL was responsible for developing almost 85 percent of all the electronic components that went into Army electronic systems. Much of its work focused on scientific and technological advancements in millimeter waves, microwaves, microelectronics, nanoelectronics, analog signal processing, frequency control, flat panel displays, tactical power sources, photonics, magnetics, superconductors, acoustic waves, and pulse power. In addition, ETDL provided support to Army combat systems by maintaining a continuously upgraded base in electronics technology and devices and resolving performance shortfalls uncovered during developmental test programs.

ETDL’s in-house research and development efforts were divided among five divisions within the laboratory: Electronic Materials, Microelectronics and Displays, Microwave and Signal Processing Devices, Power Sources, and Industrial Engineering and Development. Due to their role in building and maintaining the Army’s electronic systems, the divisions worked closely with centers and laboratories across the U.S. Army for a wide range of research and development purposes. ETDL advanced communications technology with the U.S. Army Communications-Electronics Command, meteorology with the Atmospheric Sciences Laboratory, surveillance electronics with the Harry Diamond Laboratories, target acquisition systems with the Night Vision and Electro-Optics Laboratory (now part of DEVCOM C5ISR), and missile technology and avionics with MICOM and the U.S. Army Aviation Systems Command, respectively (both merged to form the U.S. Army Aviation and Missile Command).

In service of its mission, ETDL engaged in the following technology thrusts to guide its core programs: Millimeter-wave devices (35, 60, and 94 gigahertz) and pulsers for location and identification of targets through smoke and fog; high-speed signal processing devices to permit deep battlefield assessment, including identification and autonomous targeting from ground, airborne, and missile platforms; devices for compact, secure, and reliable command, control, communication, and navigation; lightweight and efficient portable power for designator and night-vision systems; intelligent interactive displays for tactical operations; wide-band jamming devices and decoy components capable of operating from expendable and airborne platforms; pulse power sources for directed beam weapons and laser designators; and small, low-cost, and reliable microelectronic modular assemblies for affordable systems.

ETDL also placed significant emphasis on the discovery and implementation of new materials for battlefield applications. Materials studied and applied to Army systems by the laboratory include the following: III-V compounds for millimeter-wave and microwave transceivers and high-speed integrated circuits; II-VI compounds for infrared and radiation detectors; magnetic compounds for miniature traveling-wave tubes and tunable filters; quartz crystal for stable oscillators and clocks; fused quartz for optical fibers; intrinsic silicon for laser seekers and high-power switches; silicon for high-speed Very Large-Scale Integration (VLSI) technology; refractory metals for IC metallization; Surface Acoustic Wave (SAW) materials for oscillators and convolvers; electroceramics for antennas and emitters; electro-optical materials for modulators and frequency converters; ferroelectric materials for phase shifters and uncooled detectors; radio frequency absorbers for composites and coatings; dielectric films for high-energy capacitors; and laser materials for pulsed lasers and continuous wave lasers.

== Projects ==
The Electronics Technology and Devices Laboratory was involved in the developing or testing of the following technologies:

- AN/GRC-142: In 1985, ETDL developed the first 1000-watt thermoelectric generator to power the AN/GRC-142 radio-teletype S-250 shelter. The on-board generator provided electric power, heat, and air conditioning to the S-250.
- AN/PPN-20 Miniature Multiband Beacon (MMB): ETDL developed an advanced solid-state transmitter for the AN/PPN-20 MMB, a lightweight radar transponder used by the Army’s Special Operations Forces for navigation, drop-zone location, air strip marking, and ordnance delivery. ETDL’s advancements in GaAs power field-effect transistors and dielectric resonator oscillator technology enabled the development of a transmitter with a warm-up time of less than one second.
- M1 Abrams: Beginning in 1989, ETDL made major improvements to the M1 Abrams tank by significantly enhancing its power capabilities and mobility with all-wheel drive, integrating electric drives and actuators in its electrical power system, and increasing voltage handling capabilities with gate turn-off thyristors.
- MEDFLI: ETDL developed the second-generation SAW processor for the MEDFLI, an airborne signal collection system for the U.S. military. Named in reference to the Mediterranean fruit fly infestation in California at the time, the MEDFLI was developed by the Electronic Warfare Laboratory during the 1980s as a radar intercept payload for unmanned air vehicles. It was capable of monitoring military millimeter wave frequency bands and detecting interference signals from hostile threat emitters at those higher frequency regions.
- Microcomputer-Compensated Crystal Oscillator (MCXO): ETDL facilitated the development of a new type of precision oscillator known as the microcomputer-compensated crystal oscillator (MCXO). For years, temperature-compensated crystal oscillators (TCXOs) were used in devices and applications that required precision frequency control or timing, especially when power availability was limited. When TCXOs reached a performance ceiling in frequency accuracy over a wide temperature range due to various limitations, ETDL introduced MCXOs in the late 1980s as a superior alternative. The MCXOs exhibited a significantly higher accuracy (i.e. 3 milliseconds/day) at all temperatures between -55°C and 85°C compared to conventional TCXOs (i.e. 100 milliseconds/day) while still keeping power requirements low. ETDL introduced the MCXOs to enable extremely accurate clocks for Army communications systems, such as the Single Channel Ground and Airborne Radio System (SINCGARS), the Regency Net, the Objective High Frequency Radio (OHFR), the Improved High Frequency Radio (IHFR), the MILSTAR Hand-Held Module (HHM), and the MILSTAR Improved Time Standard Module.
- Multi-Option Fuze Artillery (MOFA): ETDL collaborated with the Harry Diamond Laboratory to develop the MOFA, which employs a Doppler radar fuze and a GaAs MMIC chip. This new fuze system eliminated the need for seven different fuzes in the Army inventory.
- Sense-and-Destroy ARMor (SADARM): ETDL supported the development of the SADARM smart munition, largely through the development of hybrid and monolithic millimeter-wave technology.

Over the course of its history, ETDL also became known for its role in the advancement of numerous military electronic systems including the following: the first automatic assembly of printed circuit boards; the first ultra-stable crystal oscillators for secure radios, stable airborne radars, and Identification, Friend or Foe (IFF) systems; the first U.S. manufactured thin-film electroluminescent (TFEL) display devices; the first high-power lithium throwaway and rechargeable batteries; and the first broad application of SAW delay lines, pulse compressors, and filters for radar systems.

== See also ==
- Atmospheric Sciences Laboratory (ASL)
- Ballistic Research Laboratory (BRL)
- Harry Diamond Laboratories (HDL)
- Human Engineering Laboratory (HEL)
- Materials Technology Laboratory (MTL)
- Vulnerability Assessment Laboratory (VAL)
