= Electro-Optical Systems Atmospheric Effects Library =

The Electro-Optical Systems Atmospheric Effects Library (EOSAEL) was developed in 1979 by the U.S. Army Atmospheric Sciences Laboratory, which later became a part of the U.S. Army Research Laboratory. EOSAEL was a library of theoretical, semi-empirical, and empirical computer models that described various aspects of atmospheric effects in battlefield environments. As of 1999, EOSAEL consisted of 22 models.

== Background ==
EOSAEL was focused on weather effects and how weather impacts military technology. The battlefield environment includes many sources of aerosols and particulates, including chemical/biological agents, smoke, dust, and chaff. Weather in these environments impacts the functions of military technology, specifically electro-optical devices used for target acquisition. A need for standard tools to facilitate system performance analyses and weather impact decision aids led to development of standard algorithms for modeling efforts, which became a part of EOSAEL.

== Description ==
The EOSAEL modules provide transmittance and radiance calculations through gases, natural aerosols, battlefield aerosols, smoke, haze, fog, and clouds for bandpass and laser propagation. Its operating system is Microsoft Windows 3.1, a graphical display operating system which gives a common interface to hardware. EOSAEL models provide the visible and near-infrared (0.2-2.0 ]dm), mid-infrared (3.0-5.0 urn), far-infrared (8.0-12.0 ym), and millimeter wave (10–350 GHz) regions of the spectrum, plus 53 laser lines.
