= Atmospheric Sciences Laboratory =

Defunct research facility of the United States Army

- White Sands Missile Range, New Mexico in United States
- Atmospheric Sciences Laboratory – Logo

Site information
- Type: Military research laboratory
- Owner: Department of Defense
- Operator: U.S. Army
- Controlled by: Army Materiel Command
- Condition: Redeveloped as part of the U.S. Army Research Laboratory

Site history
- Built: 1965

The Atmospheric Sciences Laboratory (ASL) was a research institution under the U.S. Army Materiel Command that specialized in artillery meteorology, electro-optical climatology, atmospheric optics data, and atmospheric characterization from 1965 to 1992. In 1992, ASL was disestablished, and the majority of its operations, personnel, and facilities were incorporated into the newly created U.S. Army Research Laboratory (ARL).

== Locations ==
The headquarters for the Atmospheric Sciences Laboratory and the bulk of its research facilities were established in White Sands Missile Range, New Mexico. Several of ASL's research facilities were also established at Fort Monmouth, New Jersey. ASL meteorological teams were stationed throughout North America at the following sites: Fort Hunter Liggett, California; Redstone Arsenal, Alabama; Fort Belvoir, Virginia; Yuma Proving Ground, Arizona; Fort Huachuca, Arizona; Aberdeen Proving Ground, Maryland; Dugway Proving Ground, Utah; Fort Greely, Alaska; and the Panama Canal.

== History ==
=== U.S. Army Signal Corps ===
The history of the Atmospheric Sciences Laboratory dates back to the creation of the Signal Corps Laboratories in 1929. During the 1930s and 1940s, the Signal Corps directed research on electronics, radar, and communication systems at Fort Monmouth and nearby satellite laboratories. After World War II, several of the laboratories merged to form the Signal Corps Engineering Laboratories (SCEL), which continued research into advancing various Army technologies.

On April 2, 1946, SCEL deployed a team of ten men from Fort Monmouth with two modified SCR-584 vans to “A” station at White Sands Proving Ground (later renamed White Sands Missile Range) to perform tests on the captured German V-2 rockets. From these tests, it became increasingly apparent after the war that atmospheric research was vital in predicting the behavior of missiles and where it would impact. On January 1, 1949, the Department of the Army established the SCEL Field Station No. 1 at Fort Bliss, Texas to aid the team at “A” station with signal support functions. The unit at Fort Bliss conducted research in radar tracking and communication systems for the early missile programs at White Sands Missile Range (WSMR), which then consisted of only 125 military and civilian personnel.

In 1952, Field Station No. 1 was reorganized to form the White Sands Signal Corps Agency, a class II activity under the command of the Chief Signal Officer. In 1954, the group expanded to form three teams, one at Yuma Proving Ground, one Dugway Proving Ground, and one at the Canal Zone in Panama. The organization was mainly tasked with conducting high altitude and upper atmosphere research using various rockets from the Nike-Cajun rocket to the Army tactical Loki rocket in 1957 and the Arcas rocket in 1958. In the first ten months of 1958, the Agency provided communication-electronics support for the firing of more than 2,000 missiles. Within two decades, the organization launched more than 8,000 rockets around the world, of which 5,000 were launched at the nearby White Sands Missile Range. In addition, the White Sands Signal Corps Agency saw a string of successes in multiple areas of weather research. In 1957, the researchers launched Loki II rockets into the air and tracked the drift of the metallic chaff that was released at designated altitudes using radar, obtaining new knowledge of high altitude winds in the process. Later that same year, the WSMR team saw the first successful firing of a rocket capable of being launched by a two-man team. The Agency also perfected the Voice Operated Device for Automatic Transmission (VODAT), a device that made it possible for two-way radiotelephone conversations to occur on a single frequency.

By 1959, the White Sands Signal Corps Agency had doubled in size and scope of operations and was redesignated as the U.S. Army Signal Missile Support Agency (SMSA). SMSA was responsible for providing communication-electronic, meteorologic, and other support for the Army's missile and space program as well as conduct research and development in meteorology, electronic warfare, and missile vulnerability. The agency developed the SOTIM (Sonic Observation of Trajectory and Impact of Missiles) System, which provided acoustic information on missiles upon re-entry and impact. These stations were installed at 16 different points at WSMR and were also equipped to measure wind speed, temperature, and humidity. SMSA also built meteorological rockets that could carry a 70-pound instrument package as high as 600,000 feet in order to obtain upper atmospheric data. At the time, the meteorological activities at WSMR were under the jurisdiction of the U.S. Army Electronics Research and Development Activity (ERDA) as well as the Atmospheric Sciences Office, an organization under the operational control of SCEL at Fort Monmouth.

In 1958, the U.S. Army redesignated SCEL as the U.S. Army Signal Research and Development Laboratory (USASRDL).

=== U.S. Army Materiel Command ===
In 1962, the U.S. Army disbanded the Technical Services, which included the Signal Corps, and reorganized its operations. The material development and procurement functions of the Signal Corps were transferred to the newly created Army Materiel Command (AMC), and the U.S. Army Electronics Command (ECOM) was created as a subordinate element of AMC to continue the Signal Corps' research and development endeavors. Assigned under ECOM, USASRDL was renamed as the U.S. Army Electronics Research and Development Laboratory but was soon renamed again to the U.S. Army Electronics Laboratories. During this time, SMSA also became consolidated as part of ERDA. In 1964, ERDA researchers at WSMR became the first to observe upper atmosphere tidal waves. The group later launched the world's largest balloon holding atmospheric sensing equipment in 1968 and an even larger balloon that reached a record height of 164,000 feet in 1969.

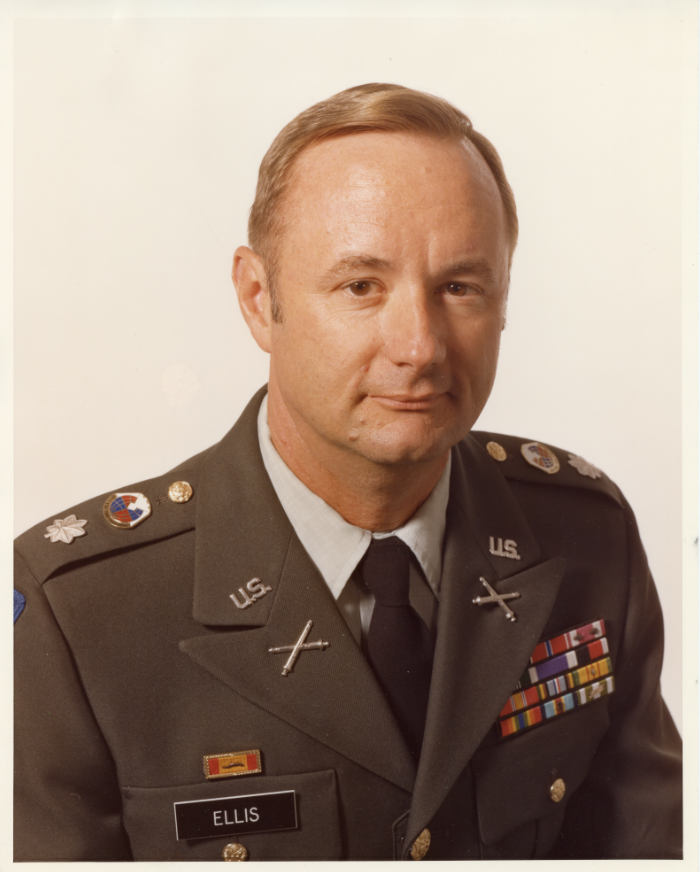
Lieutenant Colonel Ronan I. Ellis, Commander and Director of the U.S. Atmospheric Sciences Laboratory.

On June 1, 1965, ECOM ultimately made the decision to discontinue the operations of the U.S. Army Electronics Laboratories, which had adopted the duties of the Signal Corps Laboratories. The U.S. Army Electronics Laboratories was subsequently divided into six separate laboratories: the Electronic Components Laboratory (which later became the Electronics Technology and Devices Laboratory), the Communications/ADP Laboratory, the Atmospheric Sciences Laboratory, the Electronic Warfare Laboratory (part of which later became the Vulnerability Assessment Laboratory), the Avionics Laboratory, and the Combat Surveillance and Target Acquisition Laboratory. This event marked the beginning of the Atmospheric Sciences Laboratory and its role as a corporate laboratory for the Army.

ASL was responsible for conducting meteorological research, developing meteorological equipment for the Army, and providing specialized meteorological support for various Army research and development efforts. As a remnant of its days as part of the Signal Corps Laboratories, ASL headquarters was located at Fort Monmouth, New Jersey, but the majority of its meteorological research activities took place at White Sands Missile Range (WSMR) in New Mexico. Consequentially, researchers often had to travel back and forth between Fort Monmouth and WSMR until ASL established its headquarters in WSMR in 1969. Shortly afterward, ASL assumed operational control of the meteorological efforts conducted at Fort Huachuca. By 1974, the laboratory grew to a staff of more than 700 people with 90,000 square feet of meteorological operating facilities at WSMR, $30 million worth of equipment, and an annual budget of around $9 million. In 1976, meteorological research conducted at the Ballistic Research Laboratory (then known as the Ballistic Research Laboratories) was consolidated into ASL, resulting in ASL making up approximately 95 percent of the total Army program in meteorology.

In 1992, ASL was one of the seven Army laboratories that were consolidated to form the U.S. Army Research Laboratory as part of a $115 million project following the Base Realignment and Closure (BRAC) in 1988. Under ARL, ASL became part of the Battlefield Environment Directorate (BED). In 1995, the Atmospheric Analysis and Assessment team within BED moved to ARL's Survivability/Lethality Analysis Directorate (SLAD) while the rest of BED was folded into the Information Science and Technology Directorate (later called the Computational and Information Sciences Directorate) in 1996.

== Research ==
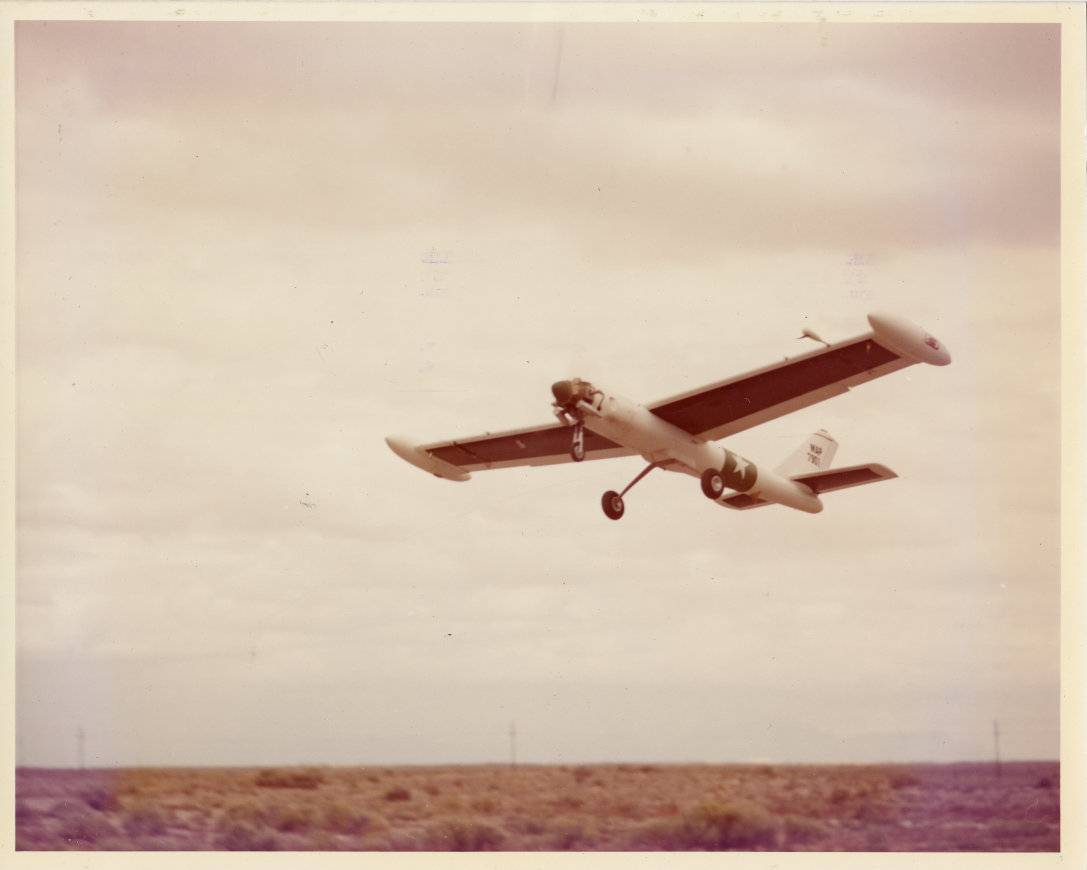
Maneuverable Atmospheric Probe (MAP) Drone operated by ASL researchers to measure atmospheric parameters.

The Atmospheric Sciences Laboratory sought to enhance Army capabilities and operation, such as artillery fire and chemical detection operations, under a broad range of meteorological conditions through the development of new technologies and techniques. Research within ASL consisted of six major areas: atmospheric sensing, microscale and mesoscale meteorology, meteorological satellites, atmospheric modification, physics and chemistry of the atmosphere, and meteorological equipment and techniques.

=== Atmospheric sensing ===
Atmospheric sensing focuses on remote and continuous real-time surveillance of atmospheric parameters and the ability to obtain meteorological information at any time and place. ASL evaluated various sensors for this purpose, such as lasers, radars, radiometers, microwave radars, and acoustic systems. Research in the laboratory included studying atmospheric transmissivity, the effects of atmospheric particulates on laser propagation, and the use of LIDAR to determine the distribution, size, and composition of atmospheric particles. ASL scientists also investigated how light behaves and responds when it interacts with different particles in the air.

=== Microscale and mesoscale meteorology ===
Microscale and mesoscale meteorology focus on understanding the small-scale atmospheric processes in the lower atmosphere. For ASL, the primary objective was to examine the properties of the lower atmosphere within the battlefield area. This task was performed by developing models that described mesoscale systems, boundary layer phenomena, and the effects of terrain on atmospheric structure. ASL researchers were especially interested in how terrain influenced the processes of atmospheric transport and diffusion. Studies in this area also coincided with research related to reducing air pollution.

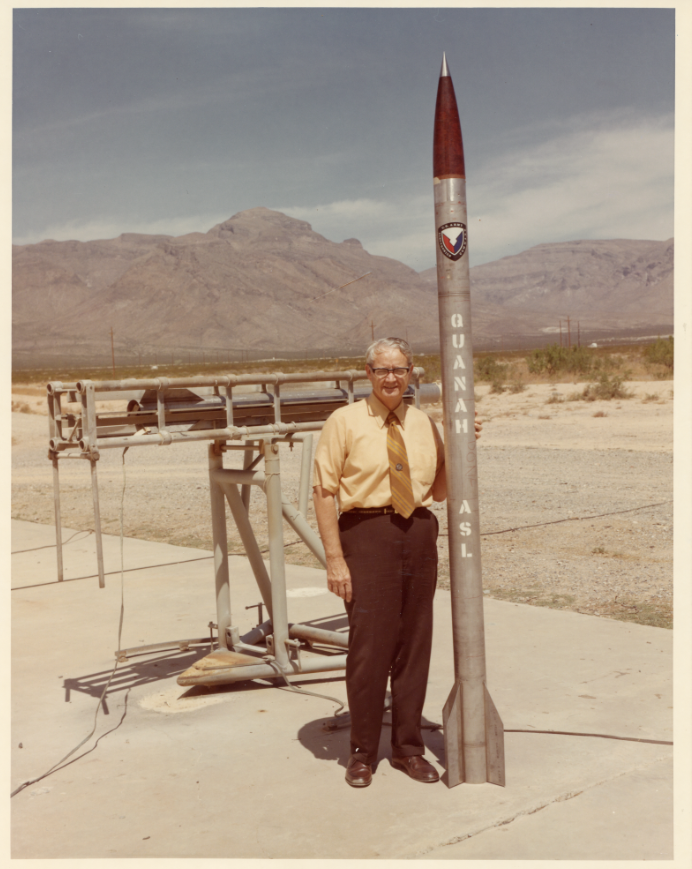
The Quanah meteorological rocket developed by ASL.

=== Meteorological satellites ===
Meteorological satellites refer to advanced weather satellites and other technologies that allow researchers to collect real-time weather information for the battlefield area. ASL researchers developed methods to improve the monitoring of mesoscale phenomena and collect meteorological data in inaccessible areas.

=== Atmospheric modification ===
Atmospheric modification focuses on physical atmospheric processes that influence the behavior of clouds, fog, and rain. ASL researchers were keen on studying warm fogs and developed numerical models that described their life cycle. Since fog significantly degrades the effectiveness of visible and infrared systems, ASL was interested in determining what kind of fog conditions hindered the fielding of different weapons systems that relied on electro-optical sensors. Field studies were also conducted to analyze how helicopter downwash could disperse warm fogs.

=== Physics and chemistry of the atmosphere ===
The physics and chemistry of the atmosphere refer to research on the chemical and dynamic processes that governed atmospheric structure and behavior. Many of ASL's studies in this realm focused on investigating the atmospheric effects on artillery and unguided rockets. Research was also conducted on the meteorological processes occurring in high-altitude regions. In addition, ASL was involved in studying the effects of an eclipse on the upper atmosphere of the earth and the outer atmosphere of the sun. During the 1979 solar eclipse, ASL performed experiments with the National Research Council of Canada, the Air Force Geophysics Laboratory, and NASA to measure various atmospheric properties during the eclipse by launching 17 sounding rockets into the upper atmosphere.

=== Meteorological equipment and techniques ===
One of ASL's main priorities was the development and evaluation of new meteorological equipment for the Army. Examples of technologies included new radiosondes, mobile hydrogen generators, fast-rise balloons, mobile weather radar, and portable automatic observing stations for collecting weather information in inaccessible areas.

== Projects ==
The Atmospheric Sciences Laboratory developed many sophisticated technologies as part of its mission. Examples include the following:

- Automatic Meteorological Station (AN/TMQ-30): A surface weather system that measures meteorological conditions such as wind speed, temperature, and atmospheric pressure at remote sites.
- Cold Fog Dissipator (AN/TMQ-27): A mobile system that uses propane to dissipate fog in very small areas, such as helipads, for safer aircraft take-offs and landings.
- Combined Obscuration Model for Battlefield-Induced Contaminants (COMBIC) model: A computer simulation model that predicts the effects of smoke, dust, and other obscurants on target acquisition and surveillance systems.
- Electro-Optical Systems Atmospheric Effects Library (EOSAEL): A computer library composed of modules that simulates the effects of different atmospheric phenomena on battlefield activity.
- Sonic Observation of Trajectory and Impact of Missile (SOTIM): A passive acoustic system that reads shockwaves to calculate the precise impact point of rockets and rocket payloads in order to recover them easier.
- Statistical Texturing Application to Battlefield-Induced Clouds (STATBIC) model: A cloud visualization algorithm that models the unpredictable characteristics of real battlefield clouds.
- Visioceilometer: A portable LIDAR system that measures cloud ceiling height and calculates atmosphere visibility.
- Mobile Imaging Spectroscopy Laboratory (MISL): A remotely controlled thermal imaging system that characterizes the changes in spectral and spatial propagation of images as a function of atmospheric conditions in real time for weapon system comparison testing and performance modeling.

In addition, ASL participated in hundreds of projects, including the support of the following technologies:

- Firefinder radar (AN/TPQ series): A radar system designed to measure wind profiles in certain atmospheric conditions.
- Field Artillery Meteorological Acquisition System (FAMAS): A mobile, data-processing system designed to accompany Army field artillery units to provide meteorological data.
- High Energy Laser (HEL): Weapon systems that use high-energy lasers to destroy or disable an enemy target.
- Integrated Meteorological System (IMETS): A vehicle-mounted, automated tactical system that receives, processes, and disseminates weather data.
- NAVSTAR GPS: A precursor to the modern GPS system.
- Pocket Radiation Detector (RADIAC): A handheld sensor device that can detect and measure radiation from nuclear detonation and fallout.

== See also ==
- Ballistic Research Laboratory (BRL)
- Electronics Technology and Devices Laboratory (ETDL)
- Harry Diamond Laboratories (HDL)
- Human Engineering Laboratory (HEL)
- Materials Technology Laboratory (MTL)
- Vulnerability Assessment Laboratory (VAL)
