= Vulnerability Assessment Laboratory =

Defunct research facility of the United States Army

- White Sands Missile Range, New Mexico in United States
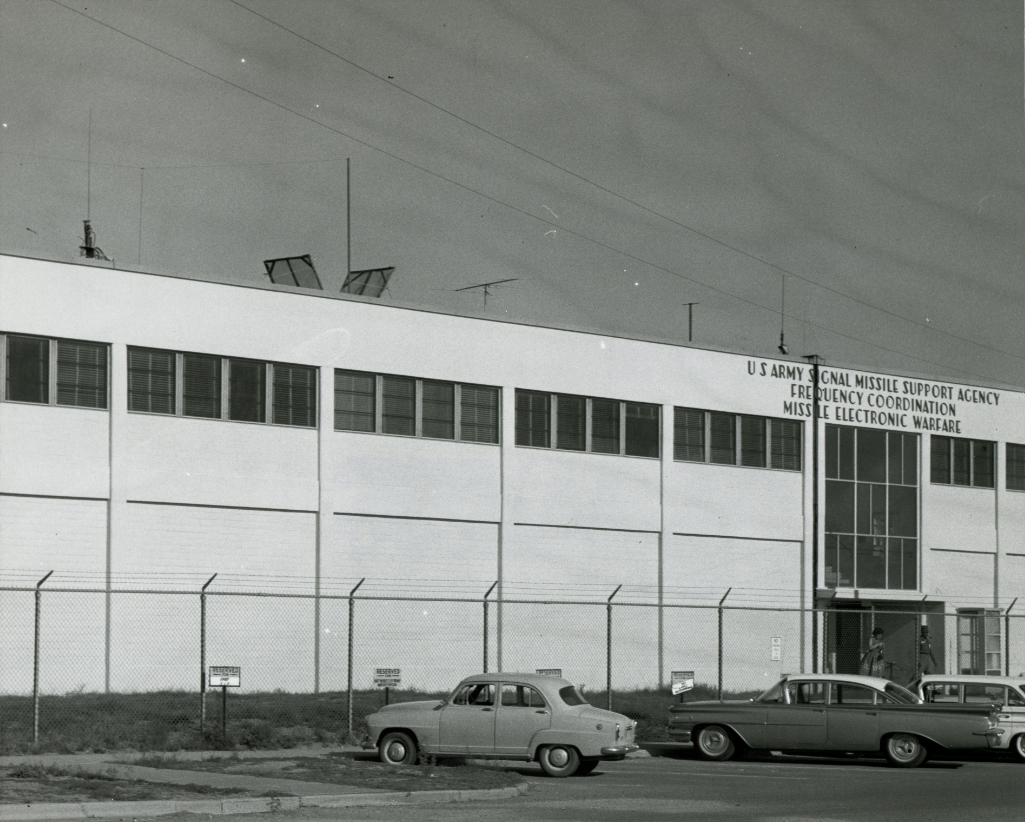
- Vulnerability Assessment Laboratory Headquarters (Building 1624), formerly the U.S. Army Signal Missile Support Agency building.

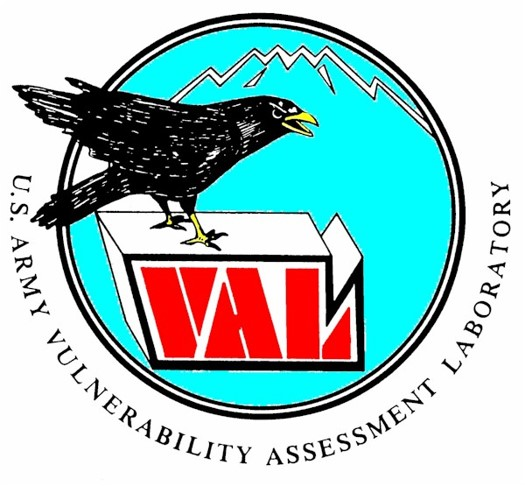
- Vulnerability Assessment Laboratory – Emblem

Site information
- Type: Military research laboratory
- Owner: Department of Defense
- Operator: U.S. Army
- Controlled by: Army Materiel Command
- Condition: Redeveloped as part of the U.S. Army Research Laboratory

Site history
- Built: 1965

The Vulnerability Assessment Laboratory (VAL) was a research institution under the U.S. Army Materiel Command (AMC) that specialized in missile electronic warfare, vulnerability, and surveillance. It was responsible for assessing the vulnerability of Army weapons and electronic communication systems to hostile electronic warfare and coordinating missile electronic countermeasure efforts for the U.S. Army. In 1992, VAL was disestablished, and the majority of its operations, personnel, and facilities were incorporated into the newly created U.S. Army Research Laboratory (ARL).

== History ==
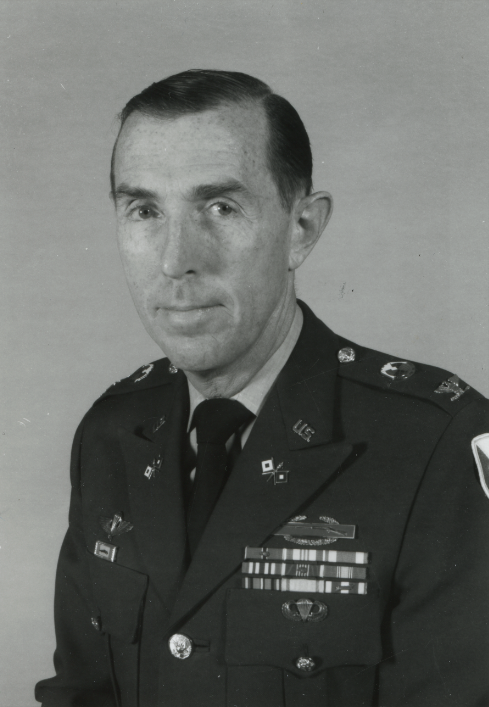
Colonel Brady J. Edwards, Director and Commander of the Vulnerability Assessment Laboratory.

On June 1, 1965, the U.S. Army Electronics Command (ECOM), a subordinate element of the U.S. Army Materiel Command (AMC), made the decision to discontinue the operations of the U.S. Army Electronics Laboratories, which had adopted the duties of the recently disestablished Signal Corps Laboratories. The U.S. Army Electronics Laboratories was subsequently divided into six separate laboratories: the Electronic Components Laboratory (which later became the Electronics Technology and Devices Laboratory), the Communications/ADP Laboratory, the Atmospheric Sciences Laboratory, the Electronic Warfare Laboratory, the Avionics Laboratory, and the Combat Surveillance and Target Acquisition Laboratory.

Within the newly organized Electronic Warfare Laboratory (EWL), the Missile Electronic Warfare Division represents the origin of the Vulnerability Assessment Laboratory. The division’s name was later changed to the Missile Electronic Warfare Technical Area (MEWTA). In the early 1970s, MEWTA became a standalone Army organization known as the Office of Missile Electronic Warfare (OMEW). Based in White Sands Missile Range, New Mexico, OMEW was responsible for conducting research on missile electronic warfare and ascertain missile system vulnerabilities while developing appropriate electronic counter-countermeasures. In 1985, OMEW was renamed the Vulnerability Assessment Laboratory (VAL). While VAL’s headquarters were located at White Sands Missile Range, major elements of the laboratory were also stationed at Fort Monmouth, New Jersey, and Kirtland Air Force Base, New Mexico. By 1988, VAL consisted of more than 250 personnel, of which 60 were military and 196 were civilian.

In 1992, VAL was among the seven Army laboratories that were consolidated to form the U.S. Army Research Laboratory (ARL) following the Base Realignment and Closure (BRAC) in 1988. Under ARL, the Vulnerability Assessment Laboratory transitioned into the Survivability/Lethality Analysis Directorate.

== Research ==
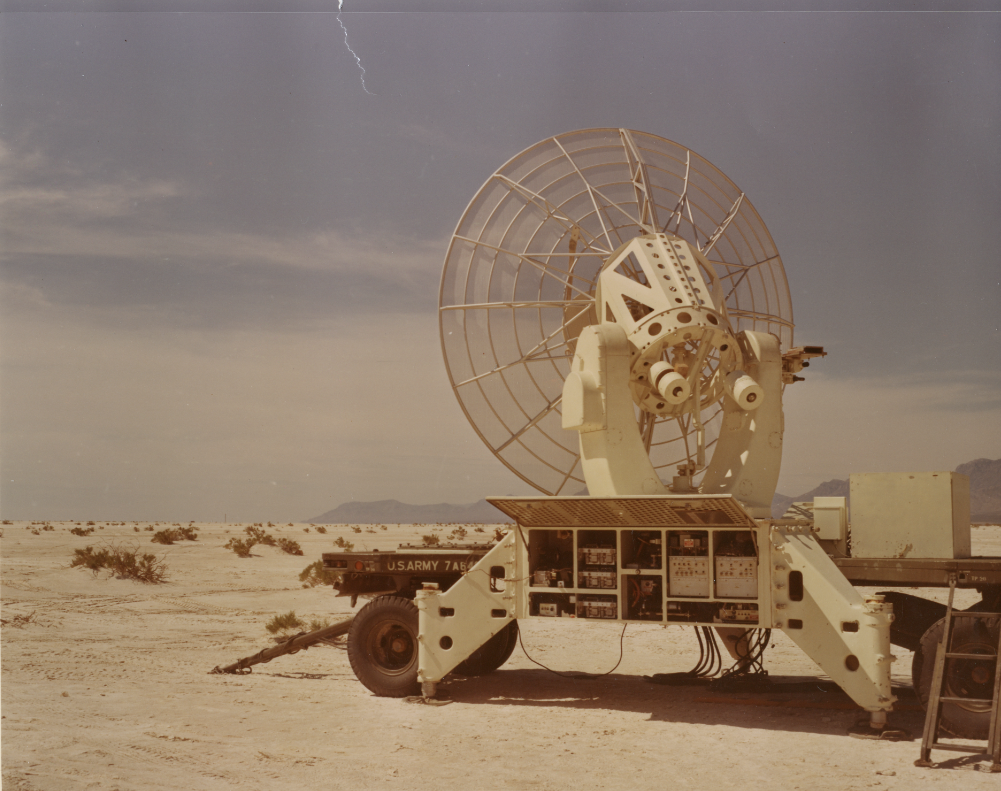
Modified Nike Ajax Radar operated by MEWTA.

The Vulnerability Assessment Laboratory was primarily responsible for conducting vulnerability and susceptibility assessments of all U.S. Army weapons, communications, and electromagnetic systems to protect against electronic warfare threats. At the time, the consolidation of all vulnerability assessment functions into a single element made the U.S. Army unique in this regard compared to the U.S. Navy and the U.S. Air Force. VAL also coordinated research on electronic counter-countermeasures and performed electronic warfare vulnerability assessments on foreign missile systems.

The Vulnerability Assessment Laboratory was made up of five divisions designed to cover each of its mission areas: Air Defense, Communications-Electronics, Close Combat and Fire Support, Foreign Missiles, and Technology and Advanced Concepts. Common electronic warfare threats that were taken into consideration by VAL included jamming, radar-reflecting chaff that hid the targets, and decoy flares. In general, electronic countermeasure assessments consisted of engineering evaluations, laboratory investigations, computer simulations, and field experiments. VAL also maintained an extensive inventory of technologies that simulated electronic countermeasure environments and developed “hardening” techniques in response to these threats.

== Projects ==
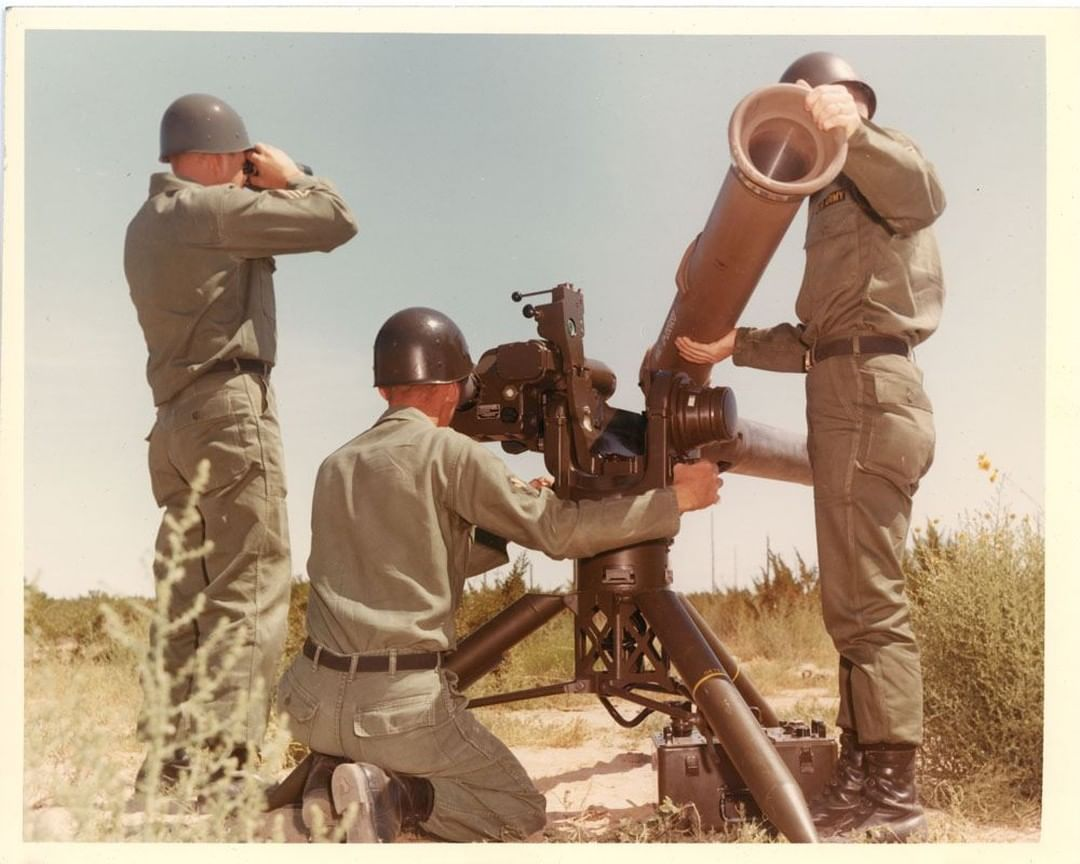
Soldiers at White Sands Missile Range operate a BGM-71 TOW antitank missile launcher during testing.

The Vulnerability Assessment Laboratory was involved in the development of several technologies, including steerable null antenna processor (SNAP) systems used against enemy jammer threats and various high-power microwaves. In 1985, VAL conducted a major field experiment testing the feasibility of the Stinger-RMP missile system, which significantly influenced its production.

VAL has also participated in the improvement of the following technologies and systems:

- BGM-71 TOW: Short for “Tube-launched, Optically tracked, Wire-guided”; an anti-tank missile with a semi-automatic guidance system.
- MIM-23 Hawk: A surface-to-air missile that used a semi-active radar homing guidance system designed to attack aircraft flying at low to medium altitudes.
- MIM-104 Patriot: A surface-to-air missile system that uses an AN/MPQ-53 or AN/MPQ-65 radar set to function as an anti-ballistic missile system.
- Night Chaparral: A variant of the MIM-72 Chaparral, a surface-to-air missile system that used Forward Looking InfraRed (FLIR) technology for enhanced night performance.
- Pershing II: A two-stage ballistic missile that had served as one of the U.S. Army's primary nuclear-capable theater-level weapons.
- Single-channel ground-air radio system (SINCGARS): A combat-net radio (CNR) used by United States and allied military forces for voice and data communications.
- Stinger Post (FIM-92B): A passive surface-to-air missile that used an IR/UV seeker to resist enemy countermeasures.

== See also ==
- Atmospheric Sciences Laboratory (ASL)
- Ballistic Research Laboratory (BRL)
- Electronics Technology and Devices Laboratory (ETDL)
- Harry Diamond Laboratories (HDL)
- Human Engineering Laboratory (HEL)
- Materials Technology Laboratory (MTL)
