= Materials Technology Laboratory =

Defunct research facility of the United States Army

- Watertown, Massachusetts in the United States
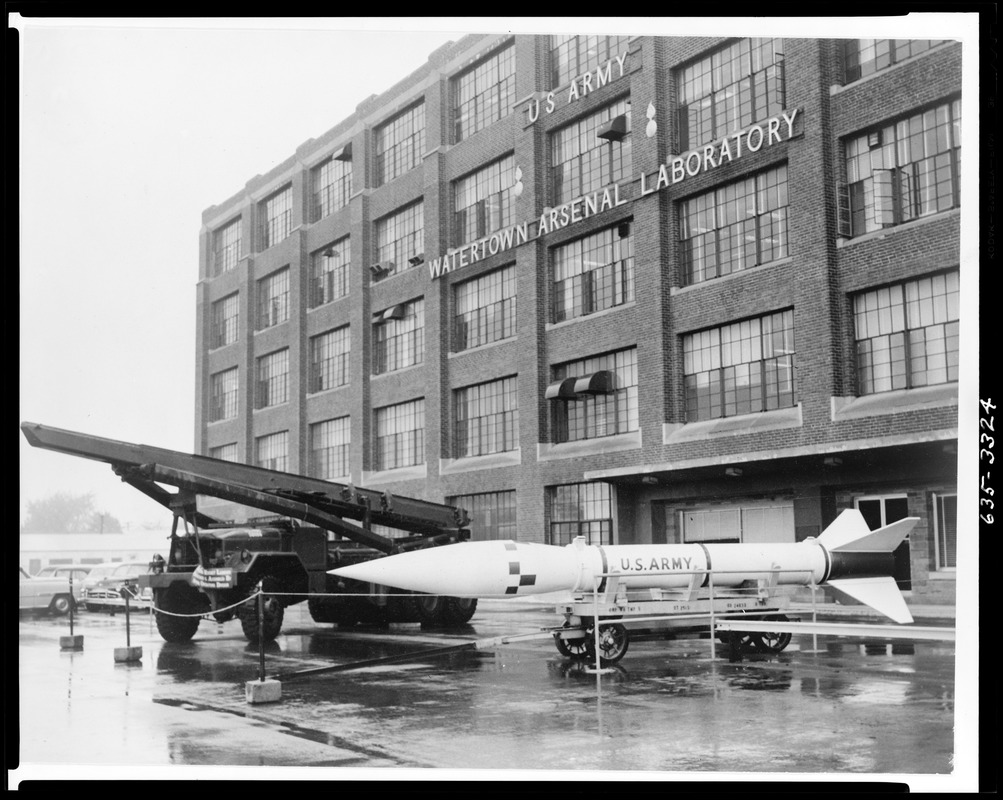
- Building 39, which housed the Watertown Arsenal Laboratories at Watertown Arsenal.

Site information
- Type: Military research laboratory
- Owner: Department of Defense
- Operator: U.S. Army
- Controlled by: Army Materiel Command
- Condition: Closed

Location
- Coordinates: 42.363°N 71.1686°W

Site history
- Built: 1953 (as Watertown Arsenal Laboratories)
- In use: 1953 - 1992

The Materials Technology Laboratory (MTL) was a research facility under the U.S. Army Materiel Command that specialized in metallurgy and materials science and engineering for ordnance and other military purposes. Located in Watertown, Massachusetts, MTL was originally known as the Watertown Arsenal Laboratories (WAL) and represented one of many laboratory buildings erected at Watertown Arsenal. Despite its name and its role in housing the arsenal's mechanical and metallurgical laboratory equipment, however, WAL operated independently from the arsenal. The facility remained in operation even after Watertown Arsenal closed down in 1967. WAL was renamed the Army Materials Research Agency (AMRA) in 1962 and then the Army Materials and Mechanics Research Center (AMMRC) in 1967 before it became the Materials Technology Laboratory in 1985. In 1992, MTL was disestablished, and the majority of its operations and personnel were incorporated into the newly created U.S. Army Research Laboratory (ARL).

== History ==
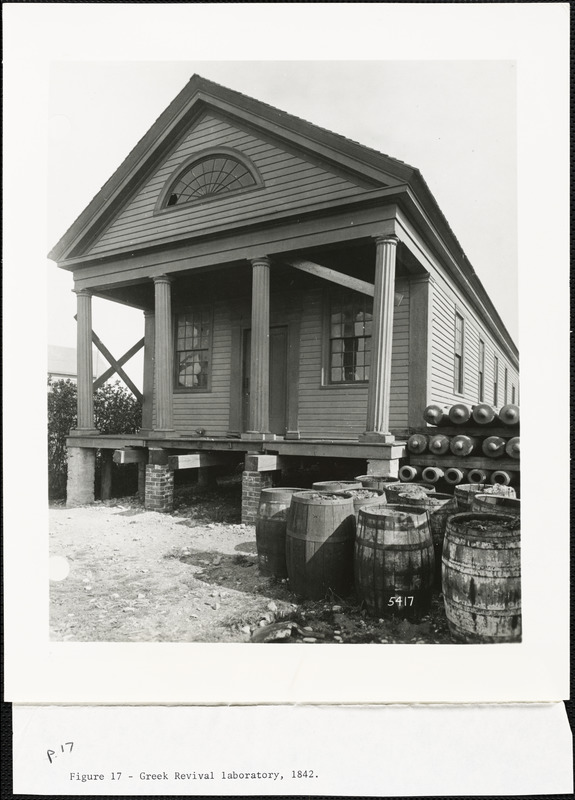
An early laboratory at Watertown Arsenal built in 1942.

Throughout its long history, Watertown Arsenal maintained several laboratory facilities that conducted mechanical testing as well as research on material development and solid-state physics. The first known instance of a laboratory at Watertown Arsenal was a one-story wooden building built in 1842. This early laboratory did not specialize in scientific experimentation but instead supported Watertown Arsenal's mission as a military supply depot. The laboratory performed a wide range of special tasks from water-proofing paper cartridges to preparing ingredients for pyrotechnics, such as port-fires, fuzes, and signal rockets. Over time, however, the building was repurposed as a storage facility and later razed in 1917.

The first notable instance of scientific experimentation at the arsenal took place under the leadership of Major Thomas J. Rodman, the commanding officer and superintendent of the arsenal from 1859 to 1865. Renowned for inventing a casting process that significantly extended the lifespan of cast-iron guns, Rodman promoted scientific investigation at Watertown Arsenal during his tenure. During the American Civil War, he supervised the construction of a second laboratory in 1862 and conducted metallurgical experiments and equipment tests in order to determine the best quality of iron for casting into guns. This second laboratory was a one-story wooden building with two wings, each 175 feet by 25 feet in dimensions. Used primarily for making small-arms cartridges, the facility was later moved to the east end of the arsenal and repurposed as a storage facility for field gun carriages in 1871. The facility was moved again in 1911 and used for lumber storage.

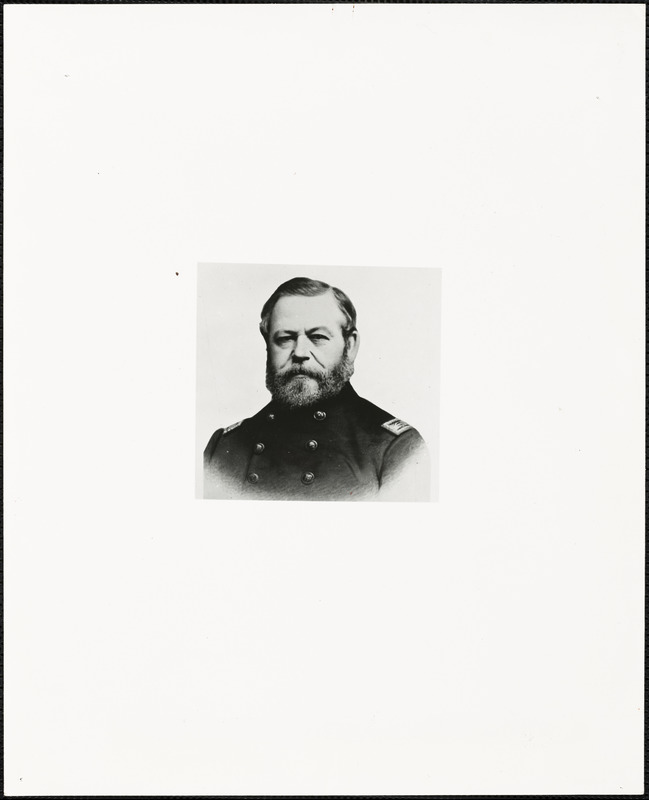
Major Thomas J. Rodman

In the years following the Civil War, Rodman's work at Watertown Arsenal brought the U.S. Army Ordnance Department’s attention to the compound as a site for future materials testing. During the 1870s, the Army’s interest in steel as a material for manufacturing guns led President Ulysses S. Grant to launch a national scientific investigation to test the merits of cast iron versus steel in terms of their strength. As part of this investigation, the U.S. government contracted engineer Albert Hamilton Emery in 1875 to design and build a machine that performs precision tests on the strength of constructive engineering materials. The machine, named the Emery Testing Machine, was capable of accurately testing 800,000 pounds of tension and one million pounds in compression. Its precision in being able to test the tensile and compressive strength of anything from an iron bar to a thin wire was celebrated as an unprecedented innovation in American engineering and military science.

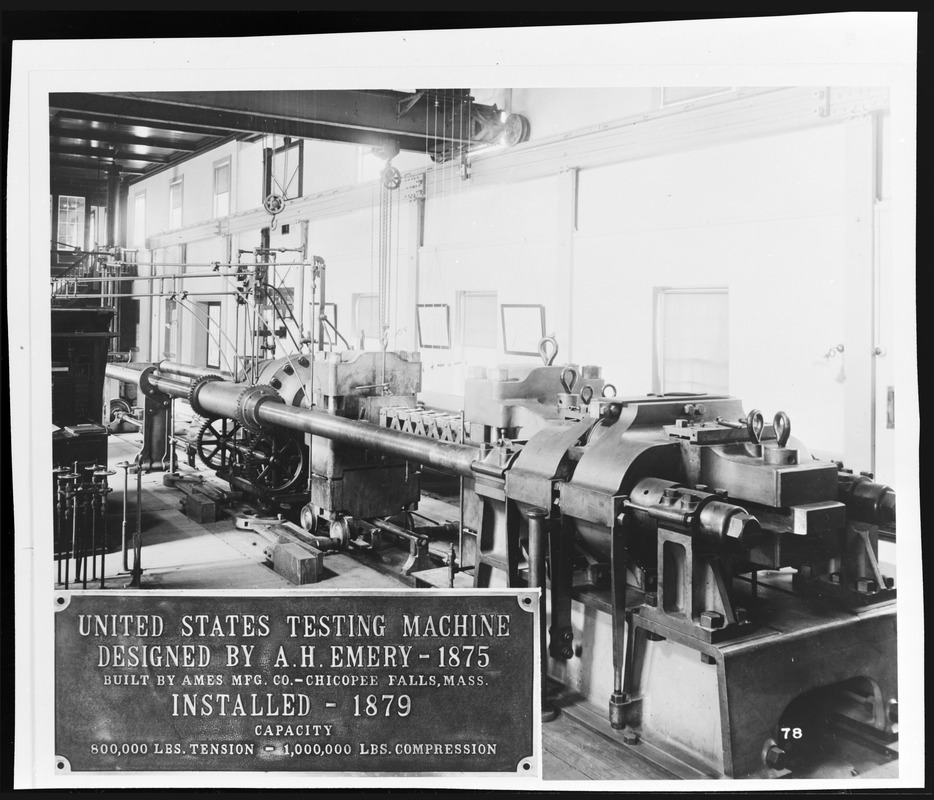
Emery Testing Machine.

Upon its completion in 1879, the Emery Testing Machine was installed in Building 71 at Watertown Arsenal, which was renamed the Physical Testing Laboratory. Erected in 1821, Building 71 was originally a blacksmith shop that housed an 18-ton reverberatory furnace as well as other equipment for making iron. The installation of the Emery Testing Machine transformed the facility into a testing lab, which not only served U.S. Army and U.S. Navy needs but also those of civilian patrons who paid to use the testing machine for their own purposes. Commercial manufacturers in iron and steel, bridge building, construction, railroad, and boiler industries leveraged the testing services offered by the laboratory to obtain data on various structural materials. From 1882 to 1918, the results of the precision tests conducted by the laboratory under the direction of the U.S. Ordnance Department were published annually in a publication titled Tests of Metals. The range of materials tested during this 36-year period included iron, steel, brass, bronze, wood, stone, and concrete as well as miscellaneous items such as manila, cotton yarn, hemp, and roller skates. In total, 87,062 tests were conducted for the government, while 27,096 were performed for private enterprise.

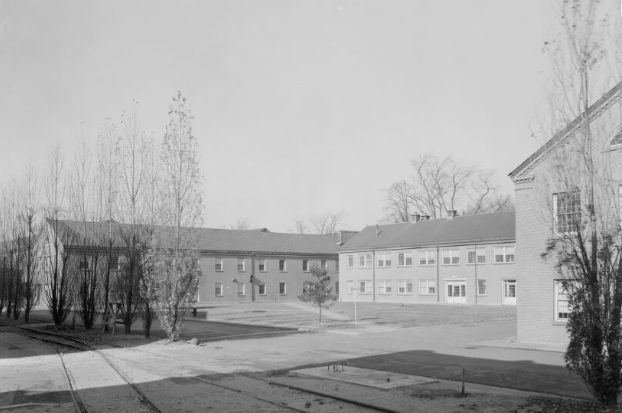
Building 73 (X-Ray Laboratory) on the left, Building 72 (Chemical Laboratory) in center, and Building 71 (Physical Testing Laboratory) on the right, together forming a U-shape.

Beginning in the 1890s, Watertown Arsenal directed more attention toward investigative research and development as it expanded its laboratory and testing facilities. By the early 20th century, the arsenal established two more laboratory facilities in the buildings near the Physical Testing Laboratory. Building 72, which was first constructed in 1821 and used as a machine shop, housed the Chemistry Laboratory on the second floor in 1896. By 1917, the Chemistry Laboratory had expanded until it occupied the entire building. Similarly, Building 73 was also originally built in 1821 to be used as a gun carriage shop but was converted into the arsenal's X-Ray Laboratory in 1923. By 1927, the laboratories at Buildings 71, 72, and 73 had obtained a wide variety of new equipment ranging from the nation's first Charpy impact testing machine to a diffraction x-ray apparatus for studying the atomic structure of metals. The laboratory complex's close relationship with the arsenal's industrial facilities allowed the arsenal to apply the scientific findings of the former to improve the manufacturing practices of the latter.

In 1923, the Ferrous Metallurgical Advisory Board was founded at Watertown Arsenal to promote cooperative research and development activities between the arsenal, private industry, and university laboratories. The advisory board worked with 45 private industrial firms to develop cast and rolled armor plate for aircraft, helmet, and body armor. The arsenal also carried out gun erosion studies with Bahelle Memorial Institute, developed improved refractory ceramics with the Massachusetts Institute of Technology, developed improved pyrometric quartz with Ohio State University, and improved forging steels with the Carnegie Institute of Technology.

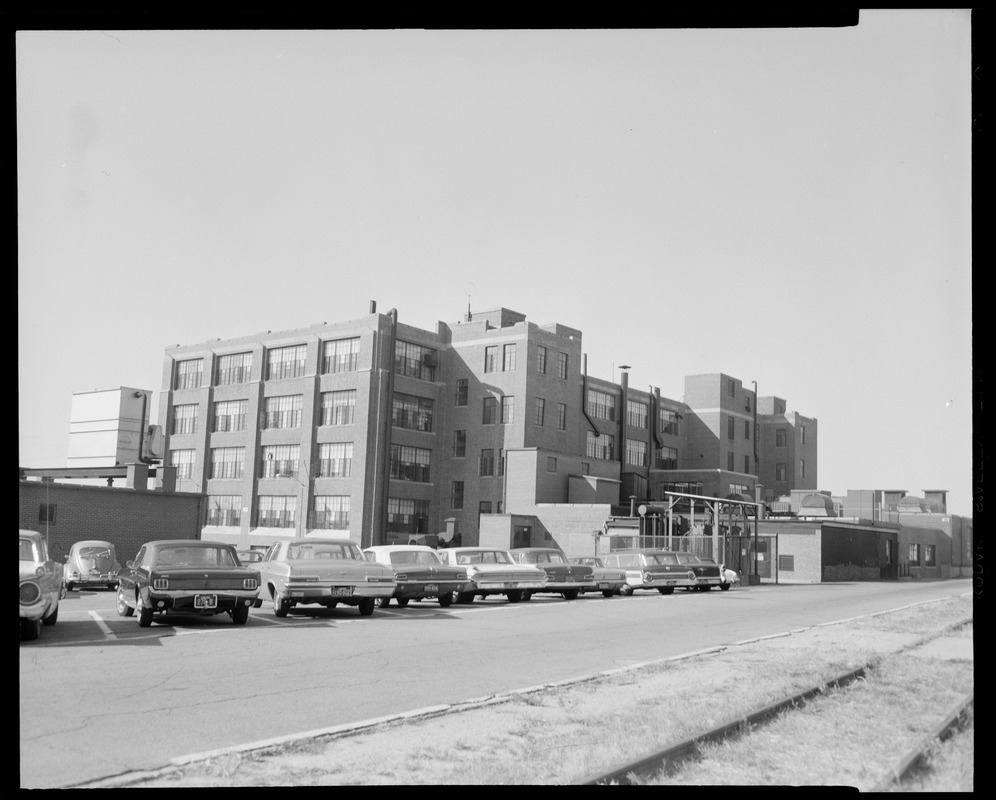
Building 39.

When activity at the arsenal boomed during World War II, Watertown Arsenal rapidly expanded not only its industrial facilities but also its research and testing facilities. In 1941, the arsenal purchased seven acres of land to the west, which included a large factory building owned by the Simmons Mattress Company. Denominated as Building 39, this factory building was used to house several divisions of government agencies, including the U.S. Atomic Energy Commission and the U.S. Air Force Geophysics Laboratory. In 1953, the arsenal converted the entirety of Building 39 into the Watertown Arsenal Laboratories (WAL), which led research in metals and ceramics, organic materials and mechanics, and structural integrity.

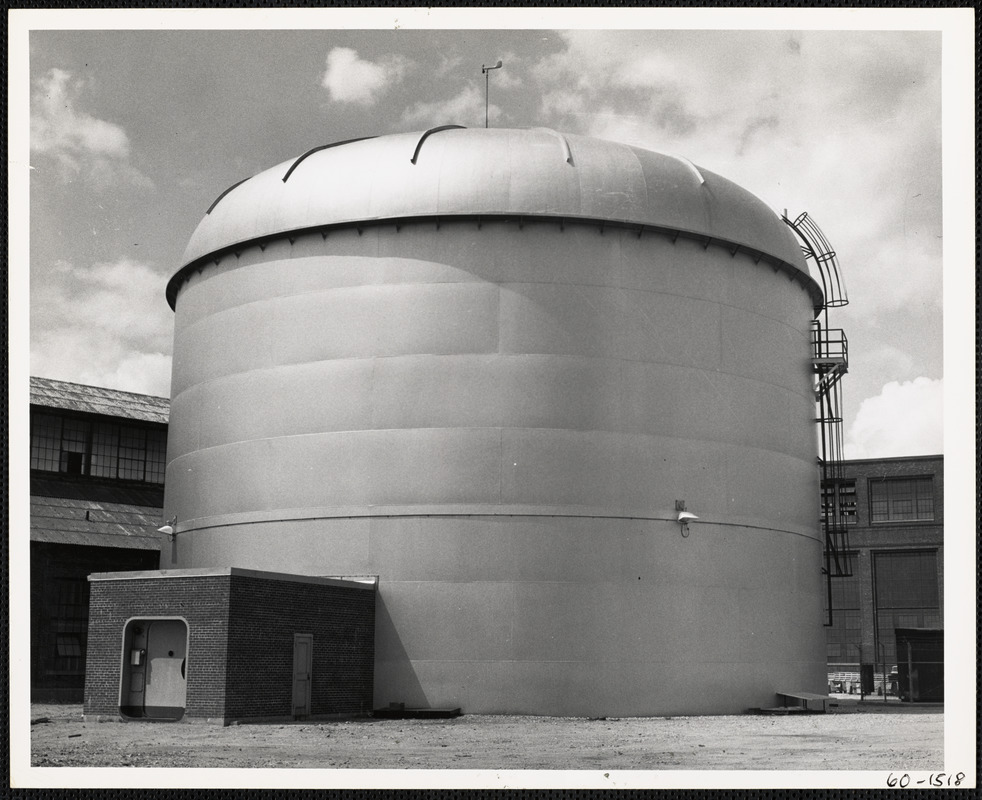
The exterior of the Horace Hardy Lester Reactor.

In 1954, the Chief of Ordnance moved the Ordnance Materials Research Office (OMRO) to Watertown Arsenal, where it not only administered materials research at other Army laboratories but also conducted in-house research. That same year, the arsenal established a new metals processing laboratory called the General Thomas J. Rodman Laboratory (unrelated to the facility with the same name at Rock Island Arsenal). Named after the former arsenal commander during the Civil War, the Rodman Laboratory focused on improving the quality of Army products while reducing their manufacturing costs, in addition to creating new materials and methods for manufacturing strategic resources. However, the Rodman Laboratory was later absorbed into the Watertown Arsenal Laboratories. With the dissolution of the Ordnance Corps in 1962, the newly established Army Materiel Command combined WAL and OMRO to form the Army Materials Research Agency (AMRA). As a corporate laboratory for the Army, AMRA developed and improved materials for Army weapons and equipment as well as set up materials specifications and standards. In addition to conducting basic and applied research in structural materials, the facility also operated and maintained the arsenal's Horace Hardy Lester Reactor, the Army's first and only research nuclear reactor, in lieu of OMRO.

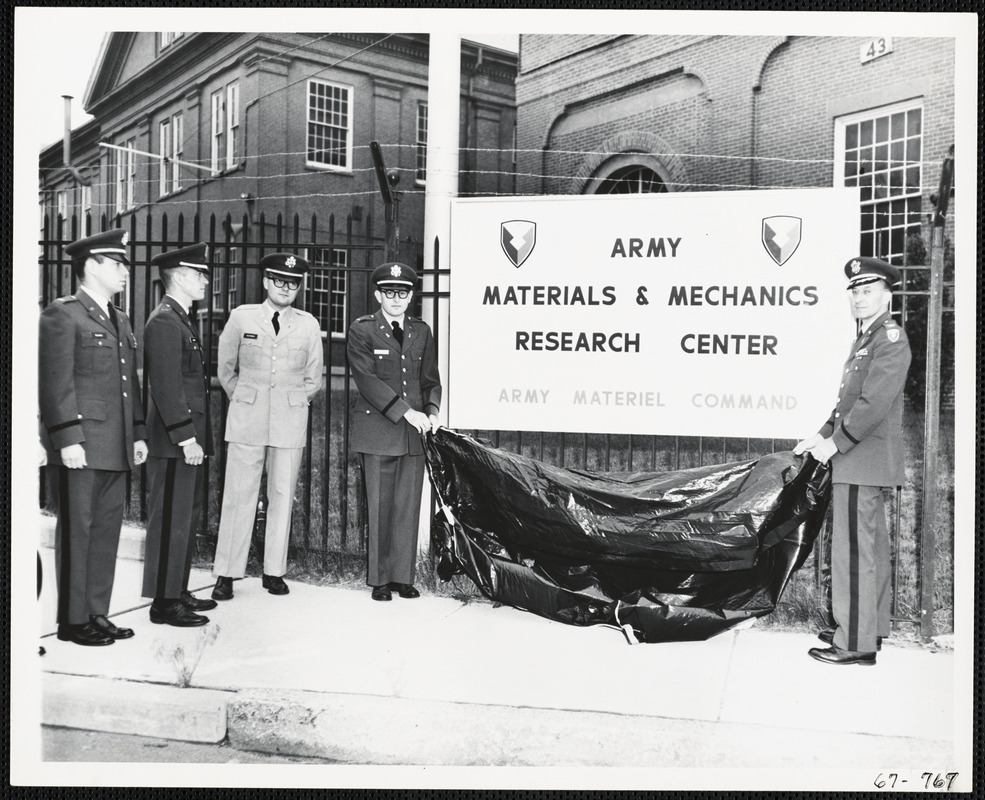
Army officials observe the formal transition from AMRA to AMMRC following the closure of Watertown Arsenal.

When Watertown Arsenal ceased operations in 1967, AMRA became the Army Materials and Mechanics Research Center (AMMRC) and remained on the site. Following the end of the Vietnam War, the budget squeezes and hiring freezes felt throughout the Army threatened to close AMMRC in 1984 due to the age of its facilities. Instead, AMMRC became the Materials Technology Laboratory (MTL) in 1985. Despite this attempt to rebrand its identity, MTL continued to face the possibility of closure throughout the 1980s. Finally, the decision to establish ARL in 1989 led to a recommendation by the Department of Defense in 1991 to consolidate the Army's corporate laboratories, including MTL, at Adelphi and Aberdeen, Maryland. As a result of the Base Alignment and Closure of 1991, most of MTL was relocated to Aberdeen Proving Ground to become part of the Materials Directorate at the U.S. Army Research Laboratory (ARL), while MTL's structures element was transferred to the NASA Langley Research Center in Hampton, Virginia, to form part of ARL's Vehicle Structures Directorate.

== Research ==
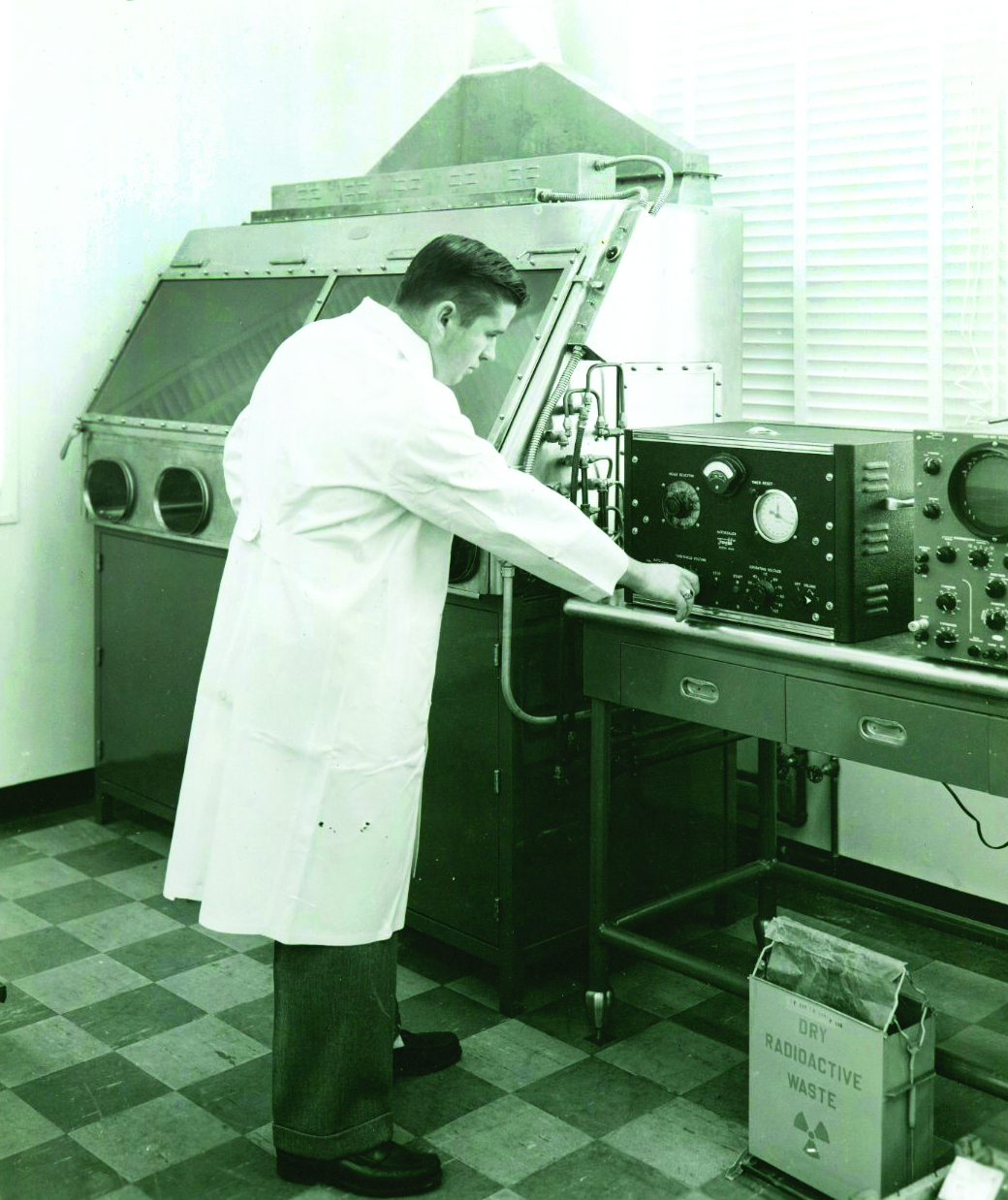
A researcher uses counting equipment in the Isotope Lab at the Watertown Arsenal Laboratory.

Much of the scientific activity that took place at Watertown Arsenal was designed to support the installation's role as an ordnance depot and a manufacturing plant. Workers at the arsenal regularly conducted tests and experiments to improve the metallurgical production processes that drove the compound's industrial facilities. With the installation of the Emery Testing Machine in 1881, the arsenal expanded the scope of its testing beyond products and materials related to Army manufacturing. Private tests commissioned by citizens and corporations uncovered the properties of countless materials from boiler plates to locomotive tires, and the data reported annually in Tests of Metals bolstered the arsenal's national reputation as a premier testing facility. However, it wasn't until 1906 that Congress formally authorized “investigative tests” at Watertown Arsenal in its appropriations bill. When this change was enacted, commanding officer Major Charles B. Wheeler increased the amount of investigative and research work performed at the arsenal until it became a major element in its operation.

The laboratory installations at Watertown Arsenal and their successors conducted both basic and applied research in a wide variety of disciplines over the course of the 21st century. Overall, these research pursuits focused primarily on the field of material science and metallurgy. Areas of interest included high-strength steels, armor materials, armaments, engine technology, electro-optical materials, chemical defense, corrosion research, and nondestructive testing. Notable research activities are listed below.

=== Laboratories at Watertown Arsenal (1842–1953) ===
==== Industrial radiography ====
During World War I, unseen defects hidden in steel castings not only led to the scrapping of partly finished work but also caused accidents when those defects went unnoticed. Following the war, researchers at Watertown Arsenal investigated the use of x-rays to better catch these defects. At the time, radiographic tests were considered only as an inspection tool. However, Watertown Arsenal researchers discovered that it was more cost-effective to use the x-rays to improve the manufacturing process rather than to evaluate the finished product. Radiography was subsequently employed to solve production issues and develop new procedures in the on-site welding industry. The use of radiography later enabled Watertown Arsenal to pioneer the application of welding in the manufacture of gun carriage components.

==== Centrifugal casting of guns ====
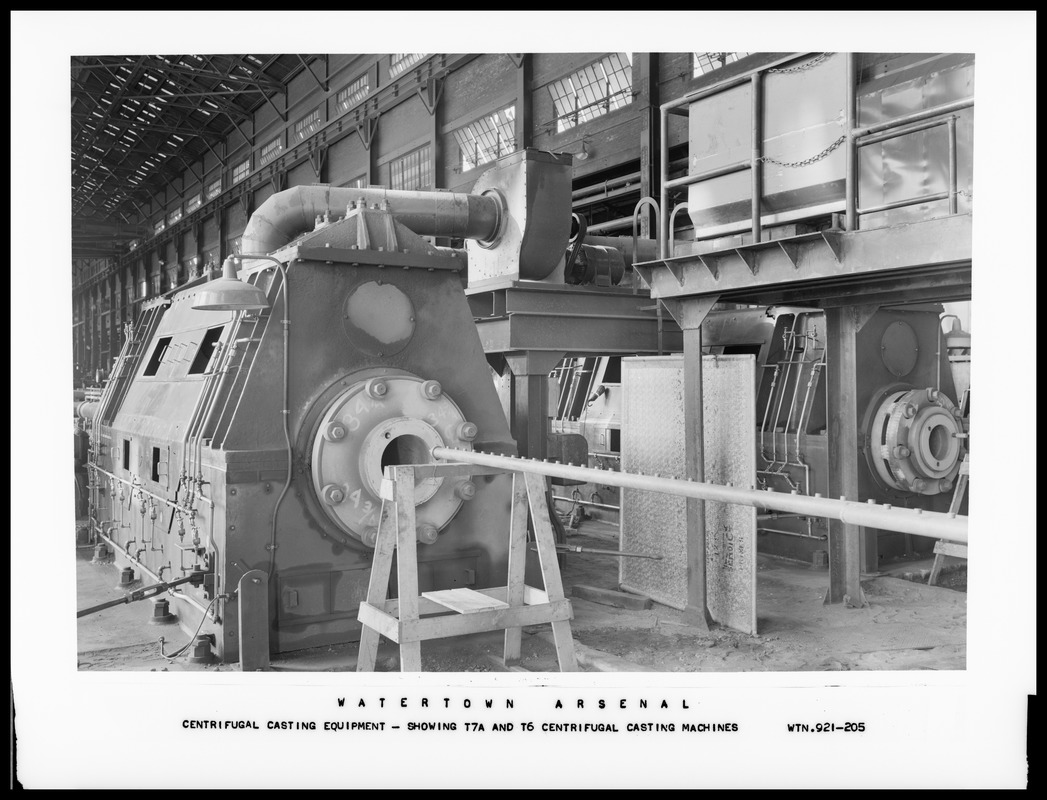
Two centrifugal casting machines used by Watertown Arsenal to produce gun barrels.

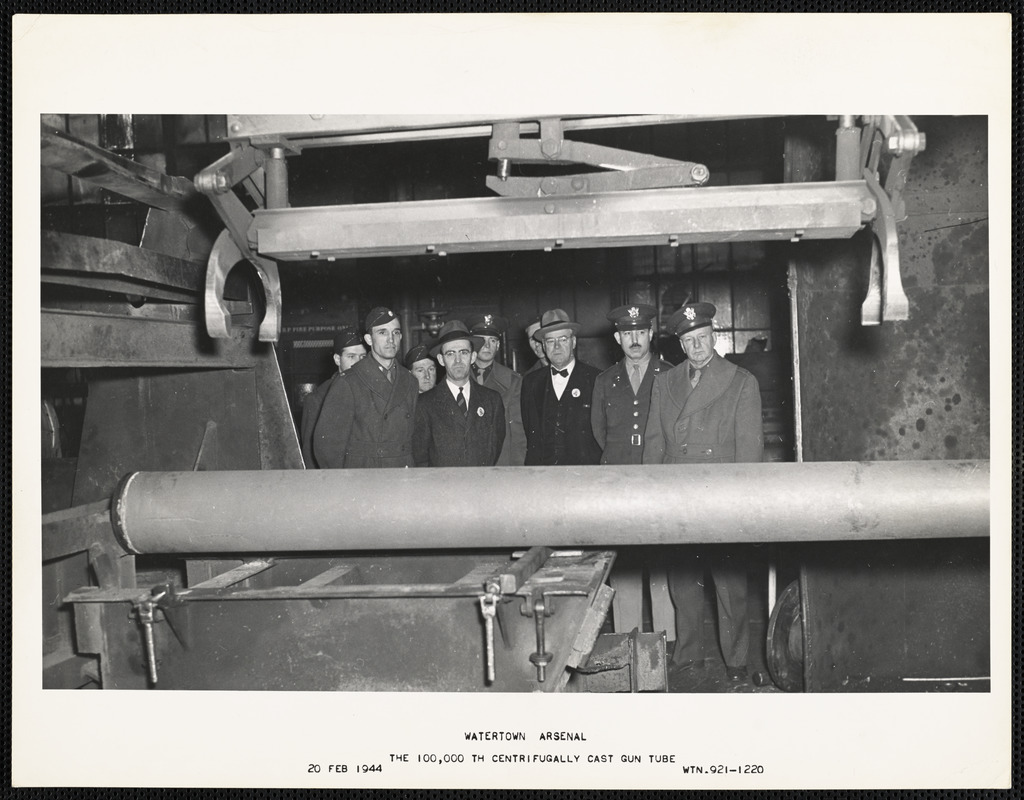
Spectators watch the production of the 100,000th centrifugally cast gun tube at Watertown Arsenal in 1944.

Watertown Arsenal led the development of centrifugal casting for gun manufacture in the late 1930s. In centrifugal casting, molten steel is poured into a rapidly rotating mold, which continues to rotate until the metal solidifies. This process not only reduced the number of casting defects, but it also significantly decreased the manufacturing time and the amount of raw materials needed to produce a gun barrel. Guns produced using centrifugal casting were also lighter while their strength remained unaffected. Following the attacks on Pearl Harbor, Watertown Arsenal initially carried out the majority of the Army's gun tube manufacturing using this technique until contributions from private industry reached acceptable levels in 1942. In 1944, the arsenal installed the world's largest centrifugal casting machine, which produced ultra-heavy artillery tubes using centrifugal casting for the first time.

==== Fragment-simulating projectiles ====
During World War II, Watertown Arsenal developed tiny steel projectiles that mimicked the behavior of flying projectiles from exploded hand grenades for armor testing purposes. Previously, evaluating how well armor materials blocked fragmenting munitions was prohibitively expensive due to how often the flying fragments missed the armor sample during testing. Researchers at Watertown Arsenal manufactured fragment-simulating projectiles in several sizes, which were then fired at armor samples from small-arms weapons. Even after the war, the Army continued to use the arsenal's projectiles for armor testing for more than 50 years.

==== Magnetic recording borescope ====
After the Army experienced a series of cannon failures in World War II, Watertown Arsenal became the first U.S. facility to detect and record cracks on bore surfaces of gun tubes in a non-destructive manner. In their search for a non-destructive method, researchers invented the magnetic recording borescope, a tool that uses a magnetic tape to identify fatigue cracks. Years later, AMRA and eventually AMMRC updated and refined the inspection process with the magnetic recording borescope to support the production of 175-mm gun tubes during the Vietnam War. In 1971, an evaluation study by Aberdeen Proving Ground personnel concluded that the magnetic recording borescope outperformed both ultrasonic and black-light borescope inspection methods.

==== V-notched Charpy impact test ====
In 1914, a Charpy impact testing machine was installed at Watertown Arsenal, making the arsenal the first facility in the United States to own one. The Charpy impact test allowed arsenal researchers to verify that armor steels were properly heat treated to exhibit sufficient toughness for armor use. While industry doubted the reliability of the Charpy test results, Watertown Arsenal researchers believed that the test could help determine the service fitness of gun steels, armor plate, breech rings, and other ordnance components. In order to convince steel producers and machine manufacturers of the Charpy impact test's reliability, the researchers designed a test that standardized and controlled all the variables that could cause discrepancies in the testing results. When the researchers proved that accurate and reproducible results could be achieved, their procedure was accepted by the American Society for Testing and Materials as a military standard.

==== Tungsten carbide projectiles ====
Watertown Arsenal was the site of the first experimental testing of tungsten carbide as an armor-piercing projectile during the 1930s. Due to possessing a significantly higher hardness and mass density than steel, tungsten carbide was demonstrated to be a more effective penetrator than standard steel armor-piercing projectiles while being lighter in weight. These tungsten carbide projectiles were later used by the Allied Forces during World War II, where they pierced the frontal armor of German tanks. After the war, Watertown Arsenal developed improved compositions of tungsten carbide as well as plastic discarding carriers for launching the tungsten carbide penetrators. In one comparison test, this new version of the projectile, named the T89E3, could be fired at a velocity of 5000 feet per second compared to the original's velocity of 3200 feet per second. However, the T89E3 was never adopted by the Army due to how the plastic carrier melted in the chamber of a hot gun.

==== Zener–Hollomon parameter ====
During the mid-1940s, researchers at Watertown Arsenal made significant developments in understanding the general deformation behavior of metals at high temperatures. These advancements were largely spearheaded by Clarence Zener and John H. Hollomon Jr., both of whom published papers that enabled the modern theory of micromechanical behavior of metals to take shape. One of the more noteworthy outcomes that emerged from this research was the Zener–Hollomon parameter, which described the relationship between changes in temperature and the stress–strain behavior of a material.

==== Ti-6Al-4V titanium alloy ====
Watertown Arsenal led the Army Titanium Program, which investigated titanium alloy development, analysis, and treatment for manufacturing purposes. Working with over 40 different contractors, the arsenal saw the development of several titanium alloy patents. One alloy jointly produced by the Armour Research Foundation and the arsenal in 1951, denominated as Ti-6Al-4V, became one of the most widely used commercial titanium alloys in the industry. Invented by Stanley Abkowitz while he worked at Watertown Arsenal, Ti-6Al-4V was hailed for its high specific strength and its excellent corrosion resistance. Abkowitz then published the first technical paper on the Ti-6Al-4V alloy on June 10, 1954.

=== Watertown Arsenal Laboratories (1953–1962) ===
==== Nuclear munitions prototyping ====
Beginning in 1958 up to 1990, WAL and its successors provided continuous support to the Program Manager for Nuclear Munitions at Picatinny Arsenal in numerous ways. Researchers at Watertown conducted design analyses of developmental nuclear projectiles and aided the manufacture of prototype components, projectiles, and accessories in order to test both experimental and fielded munitions. This collaboration helped the laboratory gain access to new facilities for processing materials that were critical for developing nuclear munitions like depleted uranium and beryllium. As part of their services, researchers at the laboratory redesigned the flawed T-5096 and XM-785 nuclear projectiles, developed a new forging process for titanium fuse components, and carried out the rapid prototyping of test projectiles simulating M454 nuclear rounds.

==== HAWK missile system ====
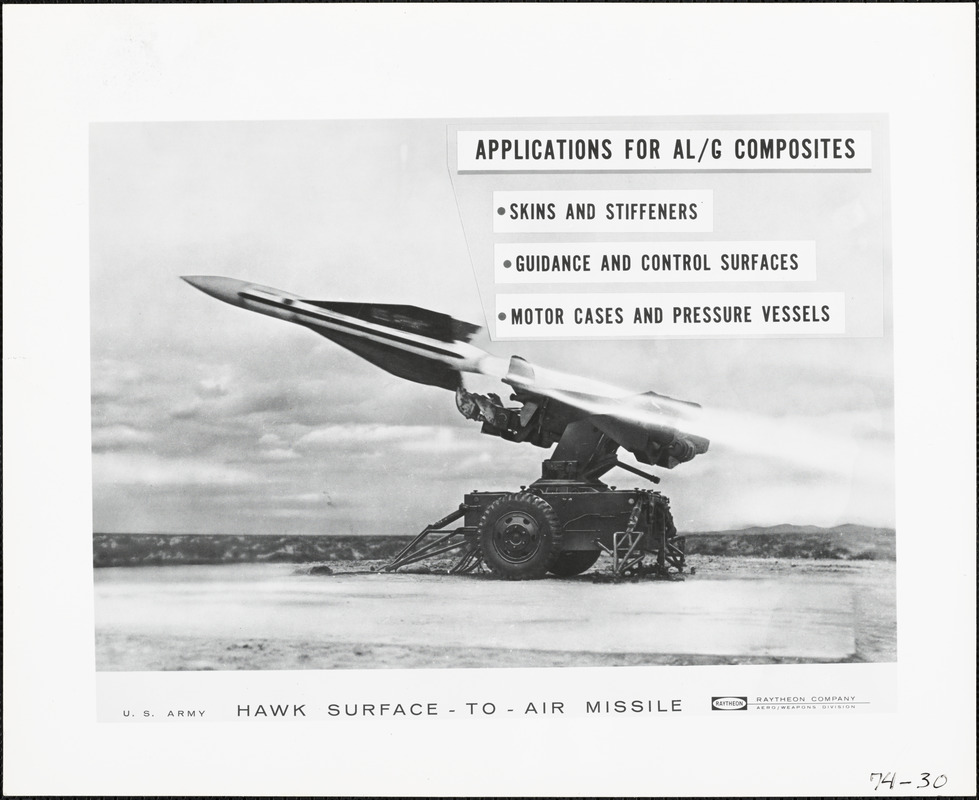
A photographic print of the HAWK surface-to-air missile.

When a HAWK missile gas cylinder suddenly exploded in 1960 while in storage at the Red River Army Depot, the Army requested WAL to help identify the cause. A rapid and thorough investigation determined that the cause of the explosion was a stress corrosion failure, and the material that the gas cylinder was made out of was partly to blame. WAL researchers subsequently teamed up with Raytheon, the prime contractor for the HAWK missile system, to improve processing and inspection procedures for the HAWK missile as well as find a new tougher steel to manufacture the gas cylinder. This incident led Raytheon to form a close working relationship with WAL as the two installations continued to work together to solve issues surrounding the HAWK missile system over the next 16 years. Topics of collaboration ranged from the heat treatment of the gas cylinder to brazing and welding problems.

=== The U.S. Army Materials Research Agency (1962–1967) ===
==== Presidential state car ====
Shortly after the assassination of President John F. Kennedy in 1963, AMRA worked closely with the U.S. Secret Service to design and armor the president's limousine in order to protect against future threats. Just 13 weeks after the assassination, a new limousine capable of protecting against small-arms ammunition, dynamite blasts, and poison gas was delivered to President Lyndon B. Johnson. Since then, AMRA and its successors have acted as consultants for the armoring of presidential state cars with each successive iteration providing more protection than the last as technology advanced. As a result of this partnership with the Secret Service, the researchers at Watertown also contributed to the design and development of armor kits for commercial limousines used by ambassadors and diplomats as well as armor components for the president's helicopter.

==== Boron carbide ceramic armor ====
During the Vietnam War, the threat from small-arms ammunition to low-flying helicopters caused the Army to seek out high-hardness, low-density materials to employ as lightweight armor. In 1964, researchers at AMRA demonstrated the first boron carbide–faced composite armor system, which proved to be the most ballistically efficient, lightweight armor system at the time. Backed by glass-reinforced plastic, the boron carbide material in the armor could protect against 7.62-mm small arms ammunition while weighing only about one-quarter of its steel armor counterpart. AMRA then worked with Natick Laboratories and private industry to develop a new industrial process of manufacturing aircrew torso shields and seats after AMRA determined that the national production capacity of boron carbide was inadequate. The development of boron carbide composite armor progressed rapidly from laboratory demonstration to large-scale production and fielding in about two years, and over 30,000 sets of aircrew torso shields were sent to allied forces in Vietnam.

==== Dual-hardness steel armor ====
AMRA was responsible for the development and commercial availability of dual-hardness steel armor, which achieved high levels of hardness without fracturing upon impact like most monolithic steels. After conceiving of a way to produce dual-hardness laminate composites in the early 1960s, AMRA engaged in industry partnerships with the Philco Corporation and the Republic Steel Corporation in 1964, which enabled the armor system to be fielded in Southeast Asia. Later, a contract with the Jessop Steel Company enabled the industry partner to become the first commercial U.S. producer of roll-bonded, heat-treatable dual-hardness steel armor. Dual-hardness steel armor has since been used in the production of combat vehicles, gun mounts, ground support equipment, and essential aircraft components.

=== The U.S. Army Materials and Mechanics Research Center (1967–1985) ===
==== Personnel Armor System for Ground Troops (PASGT) ====
Beginning in the late 1960s, AMMRC supported Natick Laboratories with the development of the Personnel Armor System for Ground Troops by developing the lightweight armor materials for PASGT. After investigating several different high-strength, lightweight materials such as titanium, AMMRC researchers decided on Kevlar after recognizing its potential as an armor material early after its initial commercialization as a tire cord material. AMMRC partnered with DuPont to develop fabric weaves, fiber finishes, and resin systems to demonstrate this potential, and the first Kevlar composite panels were ballistically tested at AMMRC in 1971. Natick and AMMRC then worked with the Ballistic Research Laboratory to further evaluate Kevlar's ballistic properties and collectively determined that its implementation could reduce casualties by 25 percent without increasing armor weight. After creating the first Kevlar helmet prototype, AMMRC continued to work together with Natick to develop the new Kevlar helmet and vest for PASGT, which were fielded in the late 1970s.

==== Flammability testing ====
In response to the growing importance of organic matrix composites in armor systems, AMMRC became responsible for flammability testing and assessment beginning in the early 1970s. Researchers conducted tests such as thermogravimetric analysis, limiting oxygen index determinations, smoke density measurements, and effluent toxicity analysis to gain insight into how a material behaves in a fire. AMMRC conducted these flammability assessments on various systems, including the GUARDRAIL Tactical Shelter, M109 Howitzer, and various composite armors and spall liners, for the purposes of fire safety. Researchers also conducted tests on the M2 Bradley’s resin matrix composites to verify that they presented a minimal fire hazard in case the vehicle received damage on the battlefield.

==== Electroslag remelting ====
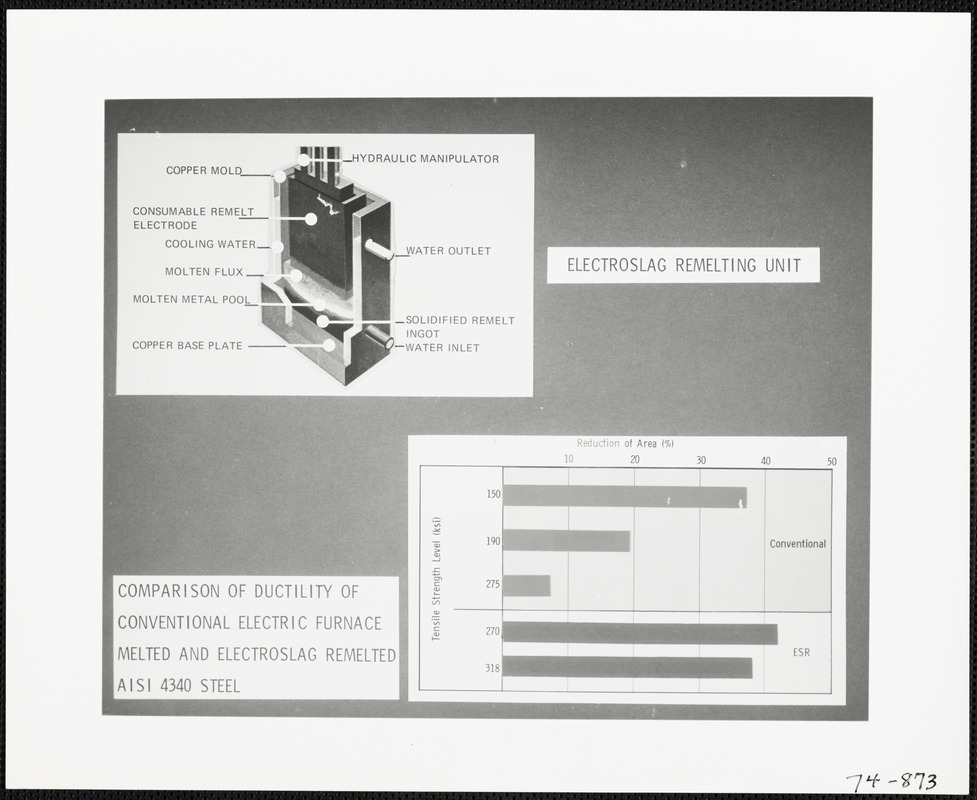
A diagram illustrating the components of an electroslag remelting unit.

In the early 1970s, AMMRC launched a large-scale scientific investigation into the electroslag remelting (ESR) process to address the high cost of various hard steels that the Army saw as potential armor candidates. The ESR process involved simple equipment and yielded favorable metallurgical results, which led AMMRC to view it as a method of producing high-quality but low-cost steel. Through this research campaign, AMMRC made significant improvements to the procedure and showed that ESR steels could reach levels of ballistic performance rivaling the dual-hardness steel armor at a significantly lower cost. When word of AMMRC's research on the ESR process reached members of industry, the manufacturers behind the Apache helicopter and the Black Hawk helicopter both applied AMMRC's new ESR approach to improve the durability of their respective rotorcraft.

==== Silicon nitride ceramics ====
During the 1970s, AMMRC had the largest ceramics research laboratory in the U.S. Department of Defense, which enabled researchers to make significant contributions to the development of silicon nitride–based engine technology. Among them was the discovery that yttrium oxide could be used as a sintering additive to increase the useful operating temperature of silicon nitride beyond 1300°C. This discovery led to the development of a new type of ceramic that saw commercial applications in turbocharger rotors, diesel engine components, ball bearings, and cutting tools. AMMRC researchers also developed a sintering technique that enabled them to process silicon nitride at temperatures above 1800°C in order to achieve higher densities. This procedure was later used to manufacture most silicon nitride turbocharger rotors around the world.

==== Depleted uranium ====
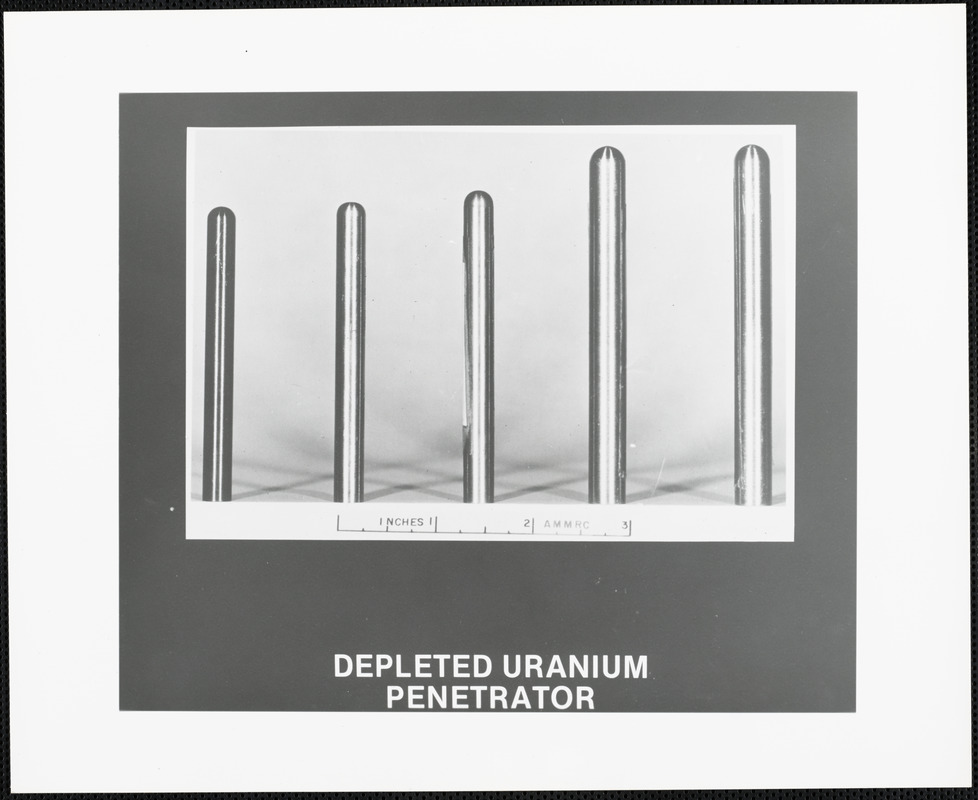
A photographic print of different depleted uranium penetrators.

AMMRC was heavily involved in research surrounding uranium alloys and often tackled issues that arose with depleted uranium (DU). In 1977, AMMRC researchers helped investigate the low-temperature firing failure of a M774 projectile. Through their combined efforts with Picatinny Arsenal, the researchers found that directionally quenching the DU penetrators during heat treatment produced higher fracture toughness properties than the conventional quenching method. This discovery led AMMRC to establish a minimum fracture toughness requirement for DU penetrators for the first time. Researchers at AMMRC also heavily studied the corrosion characteristics of DU and developed many techniques, such as an aluminum-zinc coating, to prevent corrosion damage, especially for penetrators in long-term storage.

==== Aluminum oxynitride ====
In the late 1970s, AMMRC was the first to create a polycrystalline, nitrogen-stabilized cubic aluminum oxide alloy known as ALON. It was initially produced when researchers at AMMRC were investigating silicon nitride for gas turbine applications and discovered an opportunity to create an aluminum oxide material that was 100 percent nitrogen-stabilized. AMMRC worked with Raytheon to evaluate ALON's potential in infrared missile guidance applications, and Raytheon later developed its own proprietary processing technology to manufacture ALON materials and components. Following the commercialization of ALON, the Army approved ALON guidance domes for at least one Army missile system.

==== Laminated metal-composite armor ====
AMMRC advanced the development of laminated metal–composite armors during the late 1970s in response to armor systems cracking and plugging due to adiabatic shearing. The armor materials systems designed by AMMRC featured a metal front plate, either aluminum or hard steel, backed by a fiber-reinforced organic matrix composite, often Kevlar. While the aluminum-Kevlar laminates offered enhanced fragment protection, the steel-Kevlar laminates provided superior protection against both armor-piercing small-arms projectiles and fragments. These laminated metal composite armor systems were later fielded on the M220 TOW launcher on the M901ITV in 1978, the crew seats on the UH-60 Black Hawk helicopter in 1980, the M9 Armored Combat Earthmover in 1983, and the M109 Howitzer upgrade in 1985.

==== M712 Copperhead ====
AMMRC supported the development of the 155-mm Copperhead, a cannon-launched guided projectile that was designed as an antitank weapon. When Copperhead experienced cracks in its structure early in its development, AMMRC was assigned to help the Martin Marietta Corporation with the project. Over the course of seven years, researchers at AMMRC provided routine assistance on the choice of steel and processing methods for Copperhead's control housing as well as fracture mechanics analysis on the projectile. At one point, AMMRC researchers had to convince industry contractors to replace the conventional aircraft–quality 4340 steel used on the projectile with a tougher material. A complete stress analysis carried out by AMMRC revealed the presence of high tensile strength at irregular points and led to a redesign of Copperhead.

=== Materials Technology Laboratory (1985–1992) ===
==== MIM-104 Patriot ====
During the early 1980s, MTL contributed to the development of the Patriot air defense missile by assisting the U.S. Army Missile Command and its prime contractor, Raytheon, in evaluating the ceramic material used for the missile's radar dome. MTL researchers also helped establish property requirements for the ceramic and created a new variant of the ceramic material that significantly enhanced toughness and rain erosion resistance. During the prototype evaluation phase of the Patriot missile, MTL identified critical problems in the radar dome's manufacture, which Raytheon was able to resolve.

==== Modular armor for aircraft ====
In 1986, researchers at MTL challenged traditional aircraft armor design philosophy and investigated a modular design of armor panels that could be rapidly installed or removed as well as tailored to meet certain mission needs. The main advantage of modular armor comes from how quickly it can be installed for hostile operations and replaced when it becomes damaged in battle. This design philosophy was especially appealing for military aircraft, since it provided easier up-armoring options when flying in areas of high threat density while allowing the removal of armor modules in safer areas to save on fuel. The U.S. Army subsequently launched the Aircraft Modular Armor Program, which consisted of two phases. The first phase, which was completed in 1990, saw the introduction of several modular armor prototypes. The second phase concluded in 1993 after program managers successfully tested a new modular armor system capable of defeating both 12.7-mm armor-piercing B32 bullets and 23-mm MG25 fuzed threats.

==== Shielding gas used for welding ====
Beginning in 1986, MTL researchers collaborated with the Land Systems Division of General Dynamics to find a more cost-effective weld shielding gas mixture for the M1 Abrams tank. At the time, General Dynamics relied on a patented shielding gas mixture to fabricate the M1 Abrams’ hulls and turrets, which became costly. MTL researchers tested a wide variety of gas mixtures until they identified a blend of 95 percent argon and 5 percent oxygen that was less expensive but didn't sacrifice welding performance. General Dynamics subsequently switched to this shielding gas mixture for the production of the Abrams tank.

==== Depth of penetration test ====
In 1988, researchers at MTL developed the residual penetration ballistic test to standardize the process of evaluating armor ceramics. Also known as the depth of penetration (DOP) test, it established a specific test setup that designated a specific value to measure ballistic performance. At the time, variations in testing methods made comparing ceramic armor systems difficult, so the DOP test rapidly gained acceptance within the armor community after it was introduced at a research conference in 1989. By 1993, MTL's residual penetration test was officially recognized as a military standard under MIL-STD-376.

== See also ==
- Atmospheric Sciences Laboratory (ASL)
- Ballistic Research Laboratory (BRL)
- Electronics Technology and Devices Laboratory (ETDL)
- Harry Diamond Laboratories (HDL)
- Human Engineering Laboratory (HEL)
- Vulnerability Assessment Laboratory (VAL)
