= Human Engineering Laboratory =

Defunct research facility of the United States Army

- Aberdeen Proving Ground, Maryland in United States
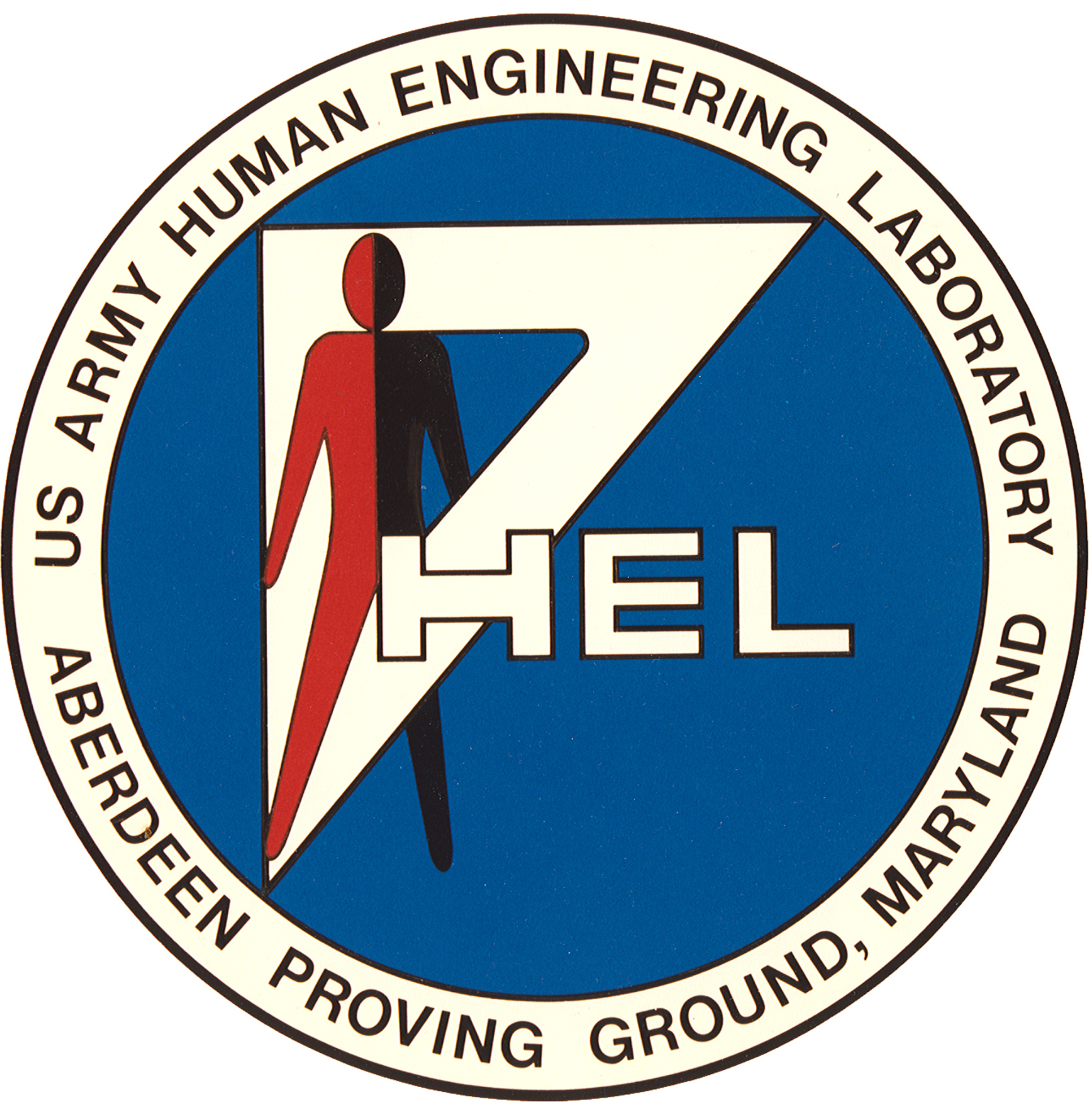
- Human Engineering Laboratory – Emblem

Site information
- Type: Military research laboratory
- Owner: Department of Defense
- Operator: U.S. Army
- Controlled by: Army Materiel Command
- Condition: Redeveloped as part of the U.S. Army Research Laboratory

Site history
- Built: 1951

The Human Engineering Laboratory (HEL) was a research institution under the U.S. Army Materiel Command that specialized in human performance research, human factors engineering, robotics, and human-in-the-loop technology. Located at Aberdeen Proving Ground, HEL acted as the Army’s lead laboratory for human factors and ergonomics research from 1951 to 1992. Researchers at HEL investigated methods to maximize combat effectiveness, improve weapons and equipment designs, and reduce operation costs and errors. In 1992, HEL was disestablished, and its mission, personnel, and facilities were incorporated into the newly created U.S. Army Research Laboratory (ARL).

== History ==
In 1951, Major General Elbert Louis Ford, the Chief of Ordnance for the U.S. Army Ordnance Corps, wrote a letter to Major General Edward MacMorland, the Commanding General at Aberdeen Proving Ground, about the Army’s need for more advanced human factors research. It stated, "It appears timely to provide human engineering assessments in our development engineering designs and in our tests of these designs. Therefore, it is proposed that certain human engineering services be included in the activities at Aberdeen Proving Ground."

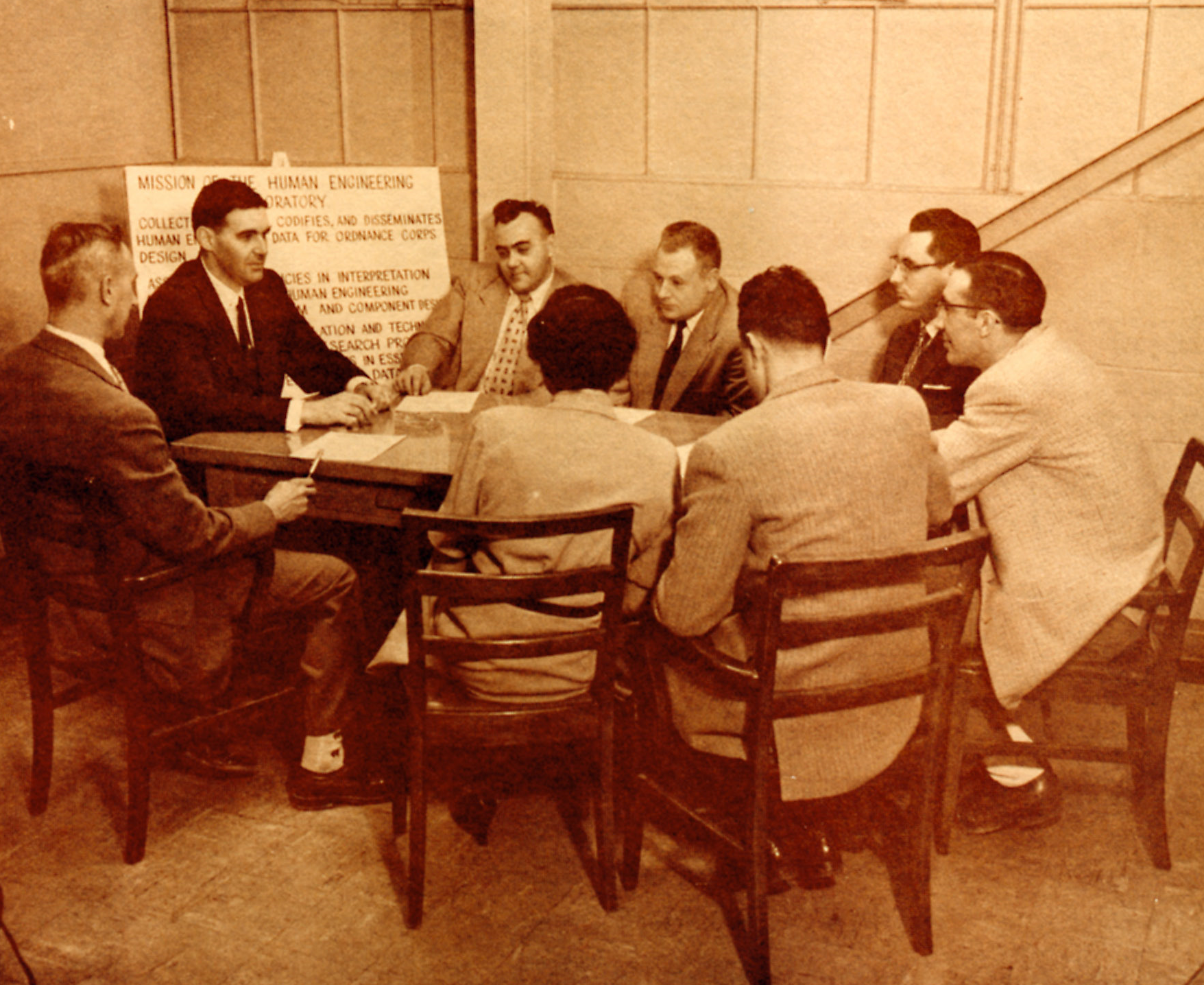
An early staff meeting at the Human Engineering Laboratory in 1956. Clockwise from left: Charles Cruse, Dr. Ben Ami Blau, Dr. Leon Katchmar, John Stephens, Robert Jelinek, Dr. John Weisz, Dr. Edward Weiss, and Lois Ivey.

In December 1951, the Ordnance Corps established the Human Engineering Group at Aberdeen Proving Ground following studies and surveys that recommended a more concrete, systematized effort of integrating human factors in weapons and equipment design. The group initially consisted of seven people and was led by its first director, Dr. Ben Ami Blau, who slowly increased the work force to around 40 military and civilian personnel. In 1953, the group’s name was officially changed to the U.S. Army Ordnance Corps Human Engineering Laboratories. In February 1957, Dr. John D. Weisz succeeded Blau as director and served in this position for over 35 years until his retirement in 1992. By that point, the organization amassed a total of 257 military and civilian employees and gained international recognition for its research in the field of human factors.

During Weisz’s tenure as director, the laboratory underwent several organizational changes. When the Army reorganization took effect in 1962, HEL became a corporate laboratory within the newly established U.S. Army Materiel Command (AMC) and became responsible for coordinating all of the Army’s human factors engineering initiatives. As a part of this reorganization, the laboratory’s name changed from the U.S. Army Ordnance Corps Human Engineering Laboratories to the U.S. Army Human Engineering Laboratories and later to the U.S. Army Human Engineering Laboratory (HEL).

During the late 1950s and early 1960s, HEL provided several project offices at Redstone Arsenal with human factors engineering support during the development of various missile systems, such as the Hawk, Jupiter, Pershing, Saturn, and Patriot systems. However, the process of developing military specifications and standards with the U.S. Army Missile Command revealed severe deficiencies in HEL’s knowledge of human performance, largely due to insufficient equipment and funding. Examples of data voids included the effects of acoustical energy on operator health and performance as well as knowledge on the symbolic representation of information on displays. In response, HEL identified the areas that required in-depth research and initiated experiments to specifically fill those data voids. These improvements eventually enabled the laboratory to develop the first simulation of the operating consoles for the Patriot system as well as apply human factors engineering to its design.

In 1968, the Army consolidated HEL, the Ballistic Research Laboratory, the Coating and Chemical Laboratory, the Nuclear Defense Laboratory, and the Army Materiel Systems Analysis Agency to create the Aberdeen Research and Development Center, which was officially established in 1969. In this new organizational structure, each of the five laboratories was managed by a civilian technical director who reported directly to a common commanding officer. However, the Center lasted only until 1972, and HEL quickly returned to being a corporate laboratory under AMC.

In 1975, AMC approved a pilot program that converted the human engineering groups at its Major Subordinate Commands into HEL detachments. HEL also gained field office representatives at major centers and schools in the U.S. Army Training and Doctrine Command. When AMC established the U.S. Army Laboratory Command (LABCOM) in 1985, HEL was one of the laboratories that became incorporated under the new Major Subordinate Command. Other elements that were realigned under LABCOM included the Ballistic Research Laboratory, the Harry Diamond Laboratories, the Materials Technology Laboratory, the Electronics Technology and Devices Laboratory, the Vulnerability Assessment Laboratory, the Atmospheric Sciences Laboratory, and the Army Research Office.

During the 1980s, HEL focused much of its resources on the Army's Manpower and Personnel Integration (MANPRINT) initiative. As the lead AMC agency for human factors engineering in MANPRINT, HEL developed new policies and tools to address issues related to systems safety, manpower, training, and health hazards in material development programs.

HEL was consolidated with the other AMC corporate research laboratories to form ARL in 1992. Its operations were merged with the MANPRINT functions of the U.S. Army Research Institute for the Behavioral and Social Sciences to create ARL’s Human Research and Engineering Directorate.

== Research ==
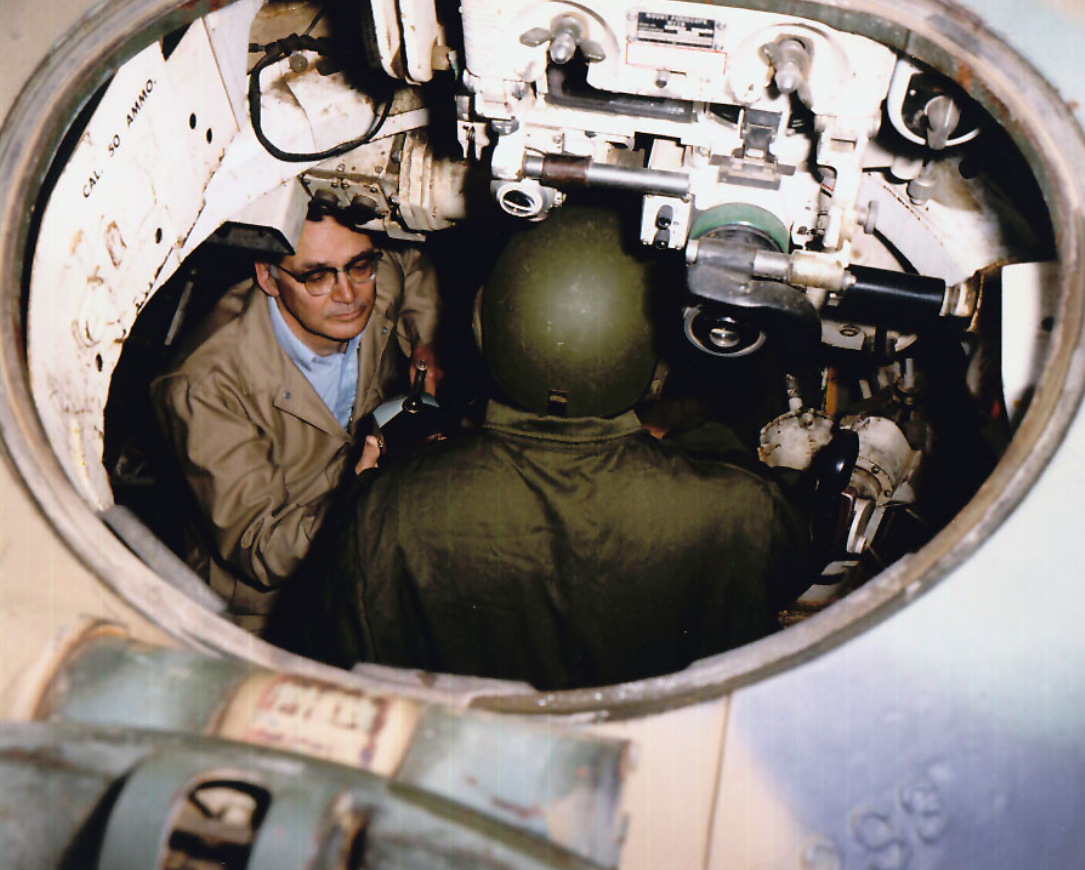
HEL researcher Georges Garinther (left) measures background noise as part of a communications test inside of a M113 armored personnel carrier.

The Human Engineering Laboratory was responsible for providing the Army with human factors engineering support in the design of combat vehicles, aviation, artillery air defense, weapons, equipment, and more. Human factors engineering places more support in considering the needs and convenience of the operator early in the design phase of weapons and equipment in order to reduce training time, labor, and human error. Researchers at HEL and its field offices conducted human performance tests at Aberdeen Proving Ground or other military installations and later work with material developers and contractors in the material acquisition process to apply their findings in material design. For these human performance tests, researchers brought in non-commissioned officers from the Army’s major military specialties as well as regular combat troops and soldiers who completed basic training to help evaluate how an equipment would fare in a battlefield environment.

HEL’s research covered areas such as the following: acoustics research, communications-electronics, fire support control, forward area supply and transfer, human visual aspects, learning and memory, logistics systems, military operations on urbanized terrain, physiological and gender factors, robotics, selective attention, stress research, systems integration, target acquisition, test bed vehicle development, text and graphic displays, visual performance, and visual search.

HEL initially had three directorates to govern its research and responsibilities. The Behavioral Research Directorate managed basic human factors research that studied systems from a soldier’s point of view. Researchers focused on factors such as vision, hearing, endurance, stress, strength, height, and weight, and recorded their findings in a large data bank that other Defense agencies could access. The Systems Performance and Concepts Directorate maintained research teams that performed tests on various weapons and equipment. Considering everything from noise levels produced by a gun to the ease with which an operator could reach a vehicle’s brake pedal, researchers in this directorate evaluated the man–machine interface for gaps in safety and efficiency. Finally, the Human Engineering Applications Directorate worked directly with military installations to ensure that all projects took human factors engineering into account during the design process. In addition to aiding the design and development of military technologies, HEL researchers also conducted troubleshooting to identify human engineering problems whenever soldiers in the field reported issues with operating or maintaining a piece of equipment.

By the late 1980s, HEL was reorganized and divided into six technical divisions: Aviation and Air Defense, Behavioral Research, Close Combat-Light and Heavy, Combat Service Support, Fire Support and Target Acquisition, and Field Support.

=== Aviation and Air Defense ===
The Aviation and Air Defense Division featured teams of engineers, computer scientists, and psychologists that worked together to enhance the operator interface of aviation and air defense material. The division’s three main teams—the Aviation team, Air Defense team, and Systems Simulation team—applied human factors engineering to the Army’s combined arms counter-air approach to air defense.

=== Behavioral Research ===
The Behavioral Research Division researched the psychological and psychophysiological capabilities and limitations of Soldiers. Topics of particular interest included the soldier–machine interface, performance in stressful environments, and human information processing. Within the division, four major teams carried out the research. The Auditory Performance team studied the mechanisms by which noises affect soldiers. The Remote Operations and Information Processing team conducted research that improved the effectiveness of systems that rely on indirect or altered presentations of visual information. The Stress and Performance team generated performance data that quantified the effects of stress. The Visual Performance team examined new methods to enhance how soldiers process visual stimuli, such as conducting research into eye movements.

=== Close Combat - Light and Heavy ===
The Close Combat–Light and Heavy Division evaluated Army weapons, clothing, equipment, and combat vehicles to increase the individual’s survivability and efficacy on the battlefield. The Individual Soldier and Equipment team focused on individual weapons including small arms and light antitank weapons as well as clothing and ancillary equipment such as backpacks and sleeping bags. The Nuclear Biological Chemical Defense team oversaw protective equipment such as chemical protective overgarments, masks, and test kits. The Armor team was responsible for human factors engineering considerations in tracked and wheeled combat vehicles, such as tanks, trucks, and jeeps. The Modeling Applications and Analysis team and the Systems Integration team developed ergonomic models and analysis technologies, respectively, that helped inform new designs.

=== Combat Service Support ===
The Combat Service Support Division consisted of teams that conducted research related to artificial intelligence and robotics. The Robotic Sciences and Military Applications team explored robotic applications to improve survivability in adverse environments, the Intelligence Machine Interface team developed the knowledge base for interfacing the soldier with various robotic devices, and the Tactical Logistics Systems team handled the application of AI to logistical systems.

=== Fire Support and Target Acquisition ===
The Fire Support and Target Acquisition Division directed efforts to improve the quality and quantity of artillery fire support while also simplifying the tasks necessary to provide this artillery fire support. Researchers often utilized commercially available test bed technologies to evaluate solutions to soldier and machine interface problems. The Test Bed Development team created new systems to evaluate concepts intended to reduce crew size and training requirements as well as increase survivability and firing platform responsiveness. The Combined Arms Command and Control team investigated new methods to simplify the planning of supporting artillery fires and enhance their responsiveness by improving the command and control interface. The Studies and Concepts team devised new fire support systems concepts, which enabled the team to define fire support system errors and develop a novel Global Positioning System artillery fuze concept.

=== Field Support ===
The Field Support Division consisted of 16 field detachments and offices across AMC. Researchers assigned to these detachments and field offices provided human factors advice to material developers and prepared Manpower and Personnel Integration assessments of Army material systems. The division also hosted three developmental shop facilities at Aberdeen which provided direct engineering and prototype fabrication support to researchers.

== HELBAT ==
As part of its mission, HEL managed the Human Engineering Laboratory Battalion Artillery Test (HELBAT) program, a series of field experiments designed to study the capabilities of the Army’s field artillery battalions. Conducted during the Army’s operational readiness tests, the HELBAT not only enabled HEL to isolate and identify sources of human error during artillery fire but also provided researchers with an opportunity to improve how the artillery evaluations were conducted. Furthermore, it allowed the Army to establish a systematic and repeatable procedure for collecting reliable data of artillery operations on the battalion scale.

In 1969, HEL launched HELBAT I, which took place at Fort Hood with battalions of M109 self-propelled 155mm howitzers from the 1st Armored Division. Although the first HELBAT was limited to the study of surprise predicted fire, it revealed that the biggest source of error, about 50 percent of the total system error, was the forward observer’s inability to locate themselves and their targets accurately. The test found that soldiers often made errors when estimating range at long distances and had difficulty reading the M2 artillery compass. Following HELBAT I, HEL worked with the Frankford Arsenal to develop a laser range finder for the forward observer that could not only measure distances but also locate targets using an azimuth scale. Two years later, HEL conducted HELBAT II, which saw a reduction in average target location errors from 490 meters to 21 meters with the laser range finder.

Improvements to other aspects of the artillery were made in subsequent HELBATs. During the 1970s, HEL conducted five more HELBATs, and HELBAT VIII took place in 1981. HEL also conducted similar field tests on armor systems, infantry systems, and rotorcraft systems during the HEL Armor System Test (HELAST), the HEL infantry system test (HELIST), and the HEL helicopter armament test (HELHAT), respectively.

== Projects ==
The Human Engineering Laboratory was involved in the development or testing of the following technologies:

- Audio Tactile Display (ATD): In 1976, HEL developed the world’s first electronic calculator for the visually impaired.
- Auditory Hazard Assessment Algorithm for Humans (AHAAH): In 1987, HEL developed the first mathematical model of the human auditory system that can assess the noise hazard for the entire range of impulse noise relevant to the Army.
- Beretta 92SB: In response to the increasing number of female troops entering the service in the 1970s, HEL conducted testing on a wide range of handguns in order to find a suitable replacement for the M1911 pistol, the standard issue sidearm for the Army since 1911. The data collected by HEL researchers helped influence the Army’s decision in 1985 to adopt the lighter Beretta 92SB as the new designated service pistol.
- FIM-43 Redeye: Starting in 1958, HEL provided human factors engineering support in the development of the Redeye anti-aircraft weapon system.
- Field Material Handling Robot (FMR): In cooperation with the National Institute of Standards and Technology and members of industry, HEL developed a six-axis, semi-autonomous robot during the late 1980s that was capable of lifting cargo as heavy as 1800kg as high as 9 meters. Designed for loading and unloading operations at Army supply nodes, the FMR was the first of its kind and was recognized as the largest, most powerful robot in the world at the time.
- Integrated Helicopter Control System: During the 1970s, HEL invented a helicopter control system that enabled a pilot to fly the aircraft one-handed. The system debuted in 1976 on a OH-58 helicopter.
- M41 Walker Bulldog: During the mid-1950s, HEL performed a human factors evaluation of the M41A1 tank’s 76mm gun.
- M72 LAW: Starting in 1958, HEL provided human factors engineering support directed toward evaluating the configuration of the weapon system as well as address its sighting and noise problems.
- MGM-18 Lacrosse: During the late 1950s, HEL performed a human factors evaluation of the surface-to-surface guided missile system. A total of 75 specific improvements were made, such as more efficient designs for cable connectors and knobs.
- MGM-29 Sergeant: Starting in 1957, HEL provided human factors engineering support in the development of the SERGEANT Artillery Guided Missile System.
- MIM-23 Hawk: In 1956, HEL was requested by Redstone Arsenal to monitor the human factors engineering aspect of the missile development.
- MIM-104 Patriot: Beginning in the mid-1960s, HEL supported the development of the Patriot system in various ways. HEL researchers created a system that faithfully simulated the Patriot engagement control console and devised solutions to its man-machine interface problems. In addition to facilitating the restructuring of the Patriot system’s display and controls, the simulator also helped train air defense console operators in testing the Patriot system. Various other human factors improvements were also made thanks to HEL’s efforts, including an automatic designation of priority threats which reduced operator reaction time, an enhanced layout of the graphical and tabular displays, and improved control coding and labeling.
- Nike Zeus: During the early 1960s, HEL provided human factors engineering support during the development of the Nike Zeus.
- PGM-19 Jupiter: Starting in 1958, HEL provided human factors engineering support in the development of the JUPITER Intermediate Range Ballistic Missile System. Although most of the design work was completed by this point, HEL’s efforts identified human factors requirements in the design of the system as well as possible design deficiencies.

== See also ==
- Atmospheric Sciences Laboratory (ASL)
- Ballistic Research Laboratory (BRL)
- Electronics Technology and Devices Laboratory (ETDL)
- Harry Diamond Laboratories (HDL)
- Materials Technology Laboratory (MTL)
- Vulnerability Assessment Laboratory (VAL)
