= Ryno =

Ryno may refer to:

== People ==
- "Ryno", nickname of Ryne Sandberg (1959-2025), American baseball player, coach, and manager
- Artur Ryno, Russian criminal
- Johan Ryno (born 1986), Swedish ice hockey player
- Ryno Barnes (born 1981), South African rugby union footballer, who most recently played with the Free State Cheetahs
- Ryno Eksteen (born 1994), South African rugby union player for the Seattle Seawolves in Major League Rugby
- Ryno Liebenberg (born 1983), South African boxer
- Ryno Pieterse (born 1998), South African rugby union player for the Bulls in Super Rugby
- Tanya Ryno, American film and television producer, director, and writer

== Other uses ==
- Ryno, Michigan, a ghost town
- Ryno (opera), an 1834 Swedish-language opera
- Ryno Township, in Nebraska, United States
- Ryno, South Africa, a place in the North West Province of South Africa

== See also ==
- Rhyno
- Rino (disambiguation)
