= Rhinoceros (disambiguation) =

A rhinoceros is any of five species of ungulates in the family Rhinocerotidae.

Rhinoceros may also refer to:

== Music ==
- Rhinoceros (band), a 1960s American rock band
  - Rhinoceros (Rhinoceros album) (1968)
- Rhinoceros (Porno Graffitti album)
- "Rhinoceros" (song), a song by the Smashing Pumpkins
- "Rhinoceros", a song by Block

== Politics ==
- Rhinoceros Party, a current satirical Canadian political party
- Rhinoceros Party of Canada (1963–93), a former satirical Canadian political party

== Theatre ==
- Rhinoceros (play), a 1959 play by Eugène Ionesco
  - Rhinoceros (Orson Welles production), a 1960 staging in London
- Theatre Rhinoceros, a theatre group

== Visual arts ==
- Rhinocéros (Jacquemart), a sculpture
- Dürer's Rhinoceros, a woodcut image

== Other ==
- Rhinoceros (film), a motion picture adaptation of the play
- Rhinoceros (genus)
- Rhinoceros 3D, computer modeling software
- Rhinoceros Sutra, an early Buddhist sutra
- Rhinoceros, a locomotive used in Bausman Mine
- Rhinoceros (Fargo), an episode of the American television series Fargo

== See also ==
- Dicerothamnus rhinocerotis or rhinoceros bush, a plant species in the daisy family
- Nashorn (German for rhinoceros), a German World War II tank destroyer
- Rhinosaurus, a prehistoric lizard
- Rhino (disambiguation)
- Rhinoceros dolphin, a mythological creature
- Rinôçérôse, a French rock/dance band
