= Rhino (disambiguation) =

Rhino is an abbreviation of rhinoceros.

Rhino or The Rhino may also refer to:

== People ==
- Rhino, the stage name of Kenny Earl, heavy metal drummer in the band HolyHell, formerly with the band Manowar
- Rhino, the stage name of Mark Smith (actor, born 1969) from the British show Gladiators
- Rhino, a nickname of English former footballer Keith Stevens
- John Edwards (musician), bass player for the rock band Status Quo, commonly nicknamed Rhino
- Doug Marshall, American mixed martial artist nicknamed "The Rhino"
- Rhino Page, an American ten-pin bowler
- Larry "Rhino" Reinhardt, guitarist for Iron Butterfly and Captain Beyond
- Rhyno (sometimes spelled Rhino); the ring name of professional wrestler Terry Gerin
- David Unsworth, an ex-Everton footballer's nickname
- Rhino - Skate photographer

== Arts, entertainment, and media ==
=== Fictional characters ===
- Rhino (character), a character from the Marvel Comics universe and sometime-foe of Spider-Man
- Rhino, a character from Bolt (2008 film)
- Rhino, a heavy Soviet tank in Command & Conquer: Red Alert 2
- Rhinos, tanks appearing in the Grand Theft Auto series of video games from Grand Theft Auto 3 to Grand Theft Auto: San Andreas
- Rhino, a playable character in the game Warframe
- Rhino Man, a villain in the 2013 Indian superhero film Krrish 3

=== Other uses in arts, entertainment, and media ===
- Rhino Entertainment, a record label company
- Rhino!, a 1964 film
- "The Rhino", a song by Quasi from their album When the Going Gets Dark
- "Rhino", Seven Days season 3, episode 3 (2000)
- "Rhino", Spider-Man (1967) season 3, episode 9a (1970)
- "The Rhino", Ultimate Spider-Man season 2, episode 3 (2013)

== Military ==
- Rhino, an informal name of the F/A-18E/F Super Hornet, used to lessen confusion between earlier models of the aircraft
- Rhino, a common nickname for the McDonnell Douglas F-4 Phantom II fighter aircraft
- Rhino APC, a South African armoured personnel carrier
- Rhino Heavy Armoured Car, an experimental World War II armoured car
- Rhino Passive Infrared Defeat System, a military Counter-IED equipment
- Rhino Runner, an armored bus
- Rhino tank, American nickname for WWII Allied tanks fitted with "tusks"

== Sports ==
- Atlanta Rhinos, a rugby league team in Atlanta, Georgia, USA
- Hampton Roads Rhinos, a proposed National Hockey League expansion team
- Leeds Rhinos, a rugby league team in Leeds, England
- Mid West Rhinos, a men's cricket team in Zimbabwe
- Rhinos women's cricket team, a women's cricket team in Zimbabwe
- Rochester Rhinos, a soccer team in Rochester, New York, USA
- The Rhinos, a nickname for the Indonesia national rugby union team
- The Rhinos, the nickname for the South Africa national rugby league team

== Software ==
- Rhino (JavaScript engine), a JavaScript engine from Mozilla
- Rhinoceros 3D (typically abbreviated Rhino, or Rhino3D), a 3-D modeling software

== Other uses ==
- RHINO (squat), the oldest squat in Geneva (Switzerland)
- Rhino, a scraping tool used in firefighting
- Rhino, a British slang term for money
- Rhino-, the Greek prefix referring to the nose, such as in rhinoplasty
- Bombardier–Alstom HHP-8, a locomotive with the nickname Rhino
- Chiappa Rhino, an Italian-made revolver with a unique design
- Yamaha Rhino, a small off-road car

== See also ==
- Rhinoceros (disambiguation)
- Rino (disambiguation)
