= Emilie Holmberg =

Swedish musician (1821–1854)

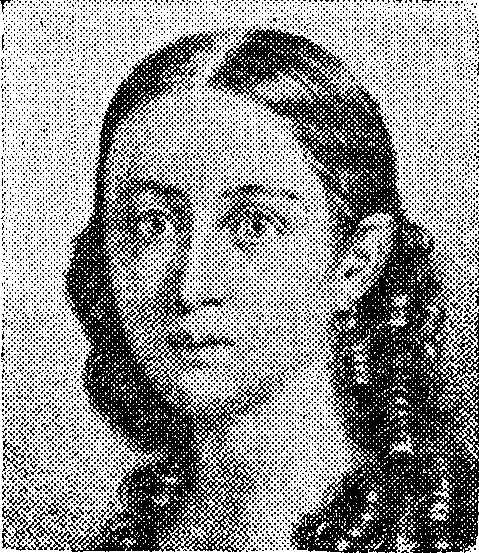
- Undated portrait of Holmberg, published in the Svenskt biografiskt handlexikon, 1906
- Born: May 6, 1821; Stockholm, Sweden
- Died: March 26, 1854 (aged 32); Charleston, South Carolina, United States

Emilie Augusta Kristina Hammarskjöld née Holmberg (May 6, 1821 – March 26, 1854) was a Swedish composer and musician. She was active as a concert singer, a pianist and a music instructor. She was a member of the Royal Swedish Academy of Music. She was likely the first woman artist from Sweden to have toured in the United States, prior to Jenny Lind. In Sweden, she is generally known only as Emilie Holmberg, as she left the country shortly after her marriage.

== Life ==
Emilie Holmberg was born in Stockholm, Sweden to merchant Carl Christian Holmberg and Aurora Emelie Hellgren. Her parents divorced in 1823, and she was supported by her mother, a successful businesswoman who founded and managed her own library.

=== Education ===
Early on, her mother noted her interest in music, and ensured she was given a musical education.

She was entrusted by her mother to the care of the composer Eduard Brendler and his wife Ulrica (Bouck) Brendler (1803–1841). She took music lessons from the composer and musical instructor Erik Drake (1788–1870), and singing lessons from the composer and organist Johan Peter Cronhamn (1803–1875).

=== Early career in Sweden ===
In 1836, at age fifteen, she published her first compositions. She wrote her own compositions, but also created music for songs written by other Swedish authors such as Euphrosyne, Böttiger, Dahlgren, Atterbom, Franzén, Mellin, and Runeberg. Several of her compositions had a noted success in her own lifetime.

In 1838, she debuted as a singer and a pianist as well, and held public concerts in both capacities. In 1841, she founded her own music institute in Stockholm with the support of her mother, where she gave lessons in music.

Her career in Sweden was successful. She was elected into the Royal Swedish Academy of Music on May 27, 1841.

In 1843, she made a study trip to Paris in the company of the poet Julia Nyberg.

=== Career in the United States ===
Upon her return to Sweden in 1844, she married Peder Hjalmar Hammarskjöld (1817–1861), estate-owner of the Skultuna mässingsbruk brass foundry. However, her new spouse was bankrupt, and after the wedding, they emigrated to the United States because of her husband's creditors.

Emilie Hammarskjöld made a grand tour of America and became very successful. She organized and performed a concert at Armory Hall in Washington, D.C. in February 1845, where she performed as a singer and a concert pianist. The success she achieved both as a singer and a pianist made it possible for her to tour the great cities of North America during the following years. She was given a very good review during her performance as a pianist in New Orleans.

She was made the offer of becoming an organist at the St Peter Cathedral in Charleston, South Carolina, which she accepted. While in Charleston, she also founded her own philharmonic society in the city. However, she died soon after.

Emilie Hammarskjöld was the mother of three daughters and a son. She died during the birth of her fourth daughter in 1854 in Charleston.

== Compositions ==
Emilie Holmberg composed seven collected works of which five are preserved. They are made in a romantic style with inventive melodies and surprising turns. Her most known compositions were:

- »Hök och Dufva» (written by Dahlgren, with music by Emilie Holmberg)
- »Göken gal i lunden» (written by Dahlgren, with music by Emilie Holmberg)
- »Ur stormarna ser jag en aflägsen hamn» (written by Böttiger, with music by Emilie Holmberg)
- »Sof, oroliga hjärta, sof» (written by Runeberg, with music by Emilie Holmberg)
- »Till skogs en liten fågel flög» (written by Atterbom, with music by Emilie Holmberg)
