= Rino =

Rino may refer to:

- Rino (given name)
- Republican In Name Only, a pejorative term for U.S. Republicans considered to be insufficiently conservative
- Rino, a singer-songwriter who performs under CooRie
- RiNo, the River North Art District north of Downtown Denver
- Nickname for American rapper Summrs

== See also ==
- Rhino (disambiguation)
- Ryno (disambiguation)
