= Rino (given name) =

- Gender: Male (Italian), Female (Japanese)

Origin
- Origin: Italian, Japanese

Rino is both an Italian masculine and a Japanese feminine given name (written: 梨乃, 莉乃 or リノ in katakana). Notable people with the name include:

== Italian name ==
- Rino Agostinis (born 1953), Canadian soccer player
- Rino Albertarelli (1908–1974), Italian comics artist and illustrator
- Rino Barillari (born 1945), Italian photographer
- Rino Benedetti (1928–2002), Italian cyclist
- Rino Corso Fougier (1894–1963), Italian Air Force general
- Rino De Candido (born 1954), Italian cyclist
- Rino Della Negra (1923–1944), French footballer
- Rino Di Silvestro (1932–2009), Italian film director, screenwriter, producer and actor
- Rino Ferrario (1926–2012), Italian footballer
- Rino Fisichella (born 1951), Italian titular archbishop
- Rino Formica (born 1927), Italian politician
- Rino Gasparrini (born 1992), Italian cyclist
- Rino Gaetano (1950–1981), Italian musician
- Rino Genovese (1905–1967), Italian actor
- Rino Iuliano (born 1984), Italian footballer
- Rino Lupo (1888–1934), Italian film director
- Rino Marchesi (1937–2026), Italian footballer and manager
- Rino Mondellini (1908–1974), Italian art director
- Rino Parenti (1895–1953), Italian fascist
- Rino Passigato (born 1944), Italian archbishop and Vatican diplomat
- Rino Piccolo, Italian film producer
- Rino Pretto (born 1959), Australian rules footballer
- Rino Pucci (1922–1986), Italian cyclist
- Rino Rappuoli (born 1952), American immunologist
- Rino Romano (born 1969), Canadian voice actor
- Rino Rossi (1889–1974), Italian judge
- Rino Salviati (1922–2016), Italian singer, guitarist and actor
- Rino Serri (1933–2006), Italian Communist Party politician
- Rino Vernizzi (born 1946), Italian classical bassoonist
- Rino Zampilli (born 1984), Italian cyclist

== Japanese name ==
- Rino Higa (ヒガ リノ; born 1992), Japanese gravure idol, actress, singer and voice actress
- Rino Katase (かたせ 梨乃; born 1957), Japanese actress
- Rino Nakasone (仲宗根 梨乃; born 1979), Japanese dancer and choreographer
- Rino Sashihara (指原 莉乃; born 1992), Japanese singer, idol and actress

== Others ==
- Rino Anto (born 1988), Indian footballer
- Rino Thunder (1933–2003), American actor
- Rino Tirikatene, New Zealand politician
- Roland Rino Büchel (born 1965), Swiss businessman and politician
