= Ryno (opera) =

Ryno eller Den vandrande riddaren (Ryno or The Wandering Knight) is an 1834 Swedish-language opera by Eduard Brendler to a libretto by Bernhard von Beskow, which was completed posthumously his patron the Crown Prince Oscar.

== Recordings ==
- Ryno. Gothenburg Symphony Orchestra, Members of the Choir of Stora Teatern, Anders Wiklund Sterling 2CD
