= Rhinocéros (Jacquemart) =

Sculpture by Henri Alfred Jacquemart

Coordinates: 48°51′37.9″N 02°19′31.7″E

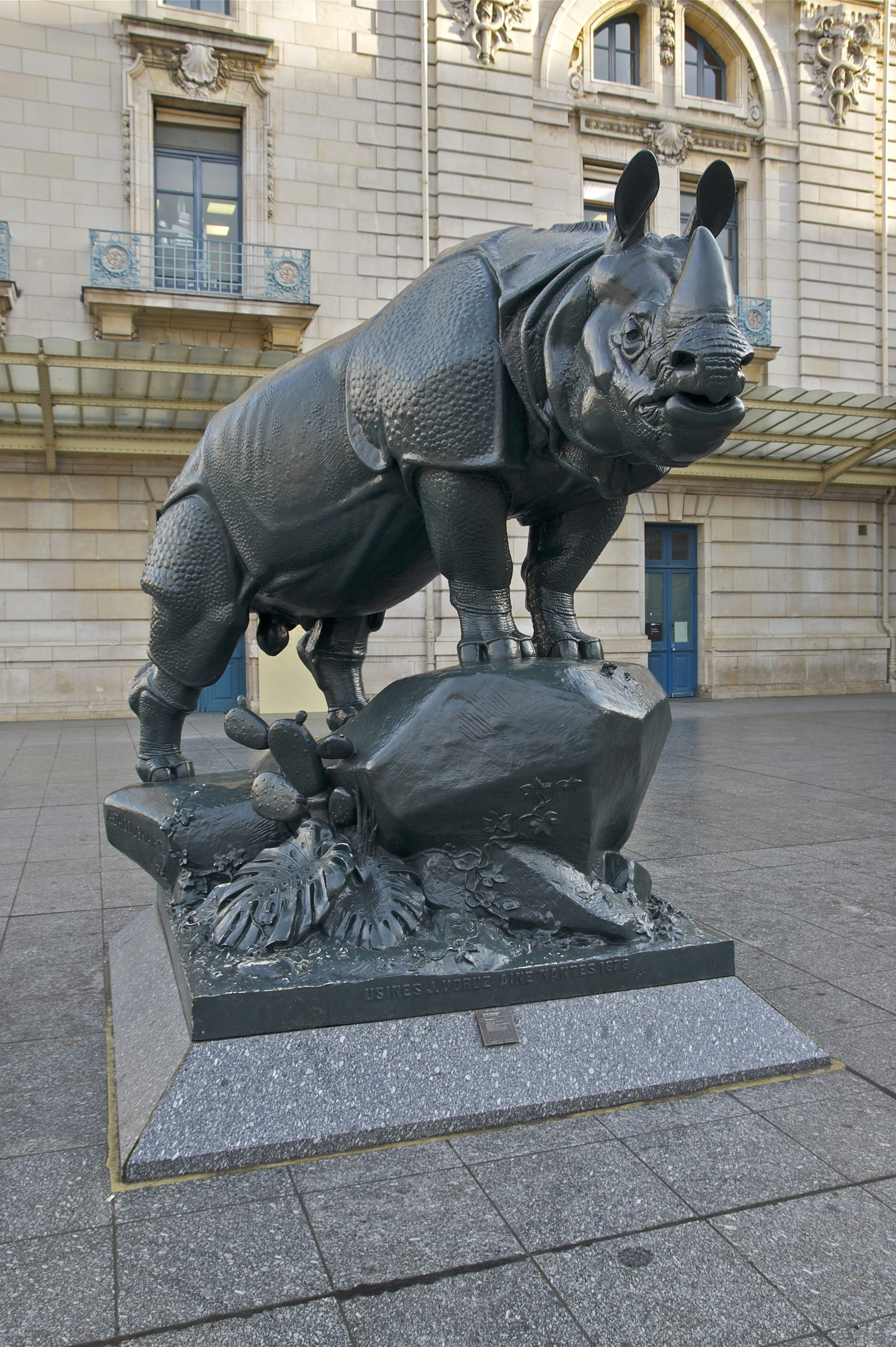
The statue in 2011

Rhinocéros is an 1878 sculpture by Henri Alfred Jacquemart; a life-sized depiction of a rhinoceros in cast iron. Commissioned to stand outside the Trocadéro Palace in Paris, France, for the 1878 Exposition Universelle, it was completed quickly to be ready in time for the opening of the fair. Well received at the time, it was moved in 1935 to allow for the remodelling of the palace and grounds for the 1937 Exposition Internationale des Arts et Techniques dans la Vie Moderne. The sculpture was sited near to the Porte de Saint-Cloud before being acquired by the Musée d'Orsay in 1985. It now stands in the esplanade in front of the museum, with two other animal statues from the 1878 exposition.

== Description ==
Rhinocéros is a cast iron sculpture of a male rhinoceros stood on a rock by Henri Alfred Jacquemart. It is sculpted in life-size proportions and measures 286 centimetres (9.38 ft) in height, 229 centimetres (7.51 ft) in width and 378 centimetres (12.40 ft) in length. It is currently located on the esplanade in front of the Musée d'Orsay, on the Rive Gauche in Paris, France. It is exhibited alongside two other contemporary large cast iron sculptures: Emmanuel Frémiet's Jeune Éléphant pris au Piège ("Young elephant trapped") and Pierre Louis Rouillard's Cheval à la herse ("horse with harrow").

== History ==
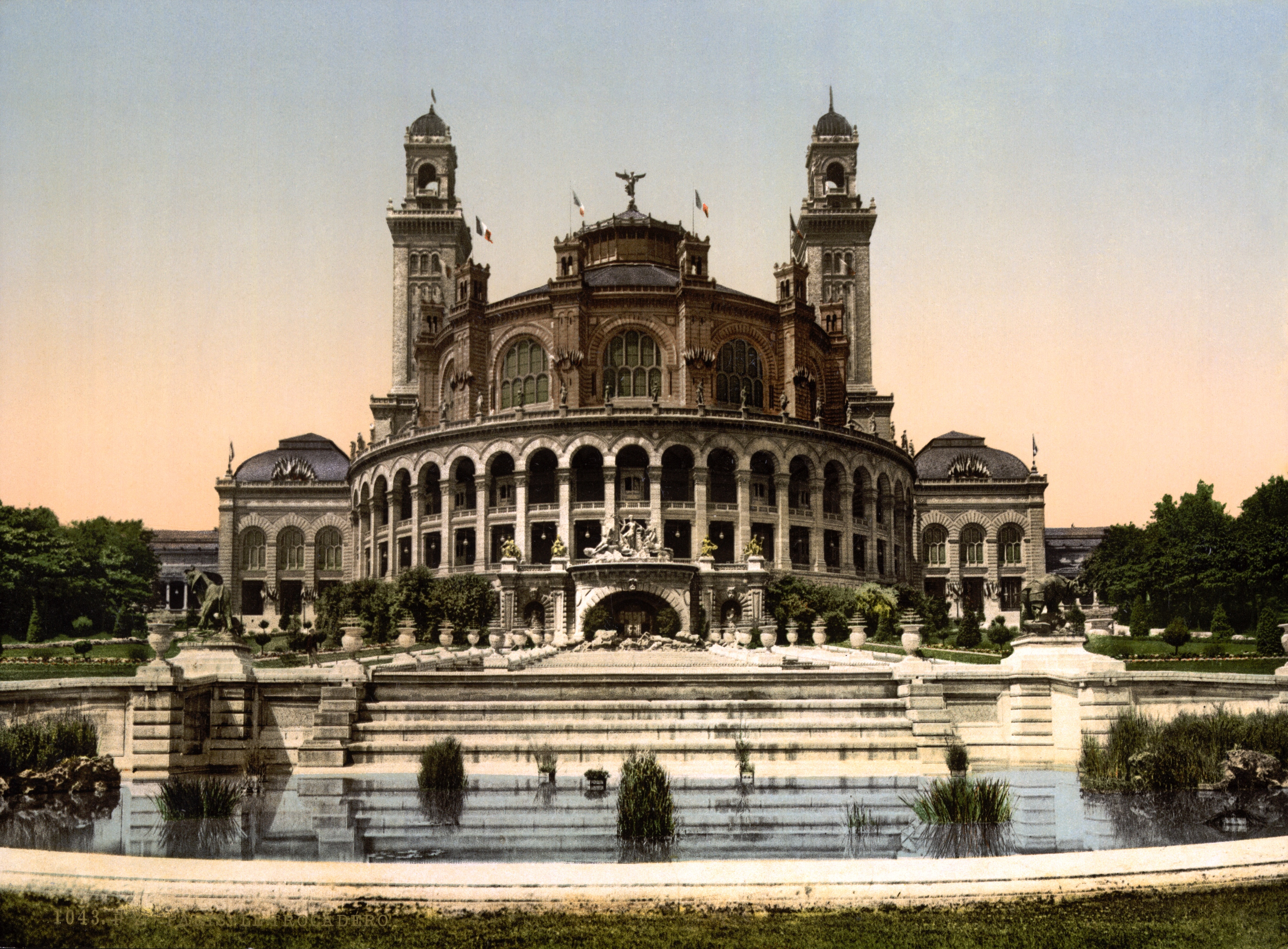
The statue (right) in its original location in front of the Trocadéro Palace

The sculpture was one of four commissioned for the 1878 Exposition Universelle, a world's fair held in Paris. Ordered in 1877, the sculptures had to be completed in less time than would usually be allowed due to the opening of the exposition. The sculptor, Jacquemart selected the Nantes foundry of J. Voruz the Elder for the work, which was cast in 1878. The statue was gilded afterwards.

The statue was originally sited near to the Trocadéro Palace, which had been built especially for the exposition. The Rhinocéros originally stood at one of four corners of a basin near the Trocadéro, which was filled by a waterfall spilling from the rotunda of the palace's concert hall. The other three corners were also occupied by statues: Frémiet's elephant, Rouillard's horse and an ox by Auguste Cain. Contemporary criticism was positive with JH Lamprey, writing in July 1878, praising the technical knowledge demonstrated by Jacquemart and rating the sculpture as one of the best of the works at the exhibition. Scribners Monthly of June 1879 complimented Jacquemart's attention to detail and modelling skill and wondered how he had made such a large animal decorative.

The Rhinocéros remained at the Trocadéro until 1935 when the palace was remodelled into the Palais de Chaillot for the 1937 Exposition Internationale des Arts et Techniques dans la Vie Moderne. The statue was relocated to a site near the Porte de Saint-Cloud. It was acquired by the Musée d'Orsay in 1985 and, after restoration at the Coubertin foundry in Saint-Rémy-lès-Chevreuse, was put on display in its current location. The Austrian sculptor Arnulf Rainer, writing in 1988, noted that the Rhinocéros looked as if it was pondering "some collective prehistoric memory".

== Gallery ==
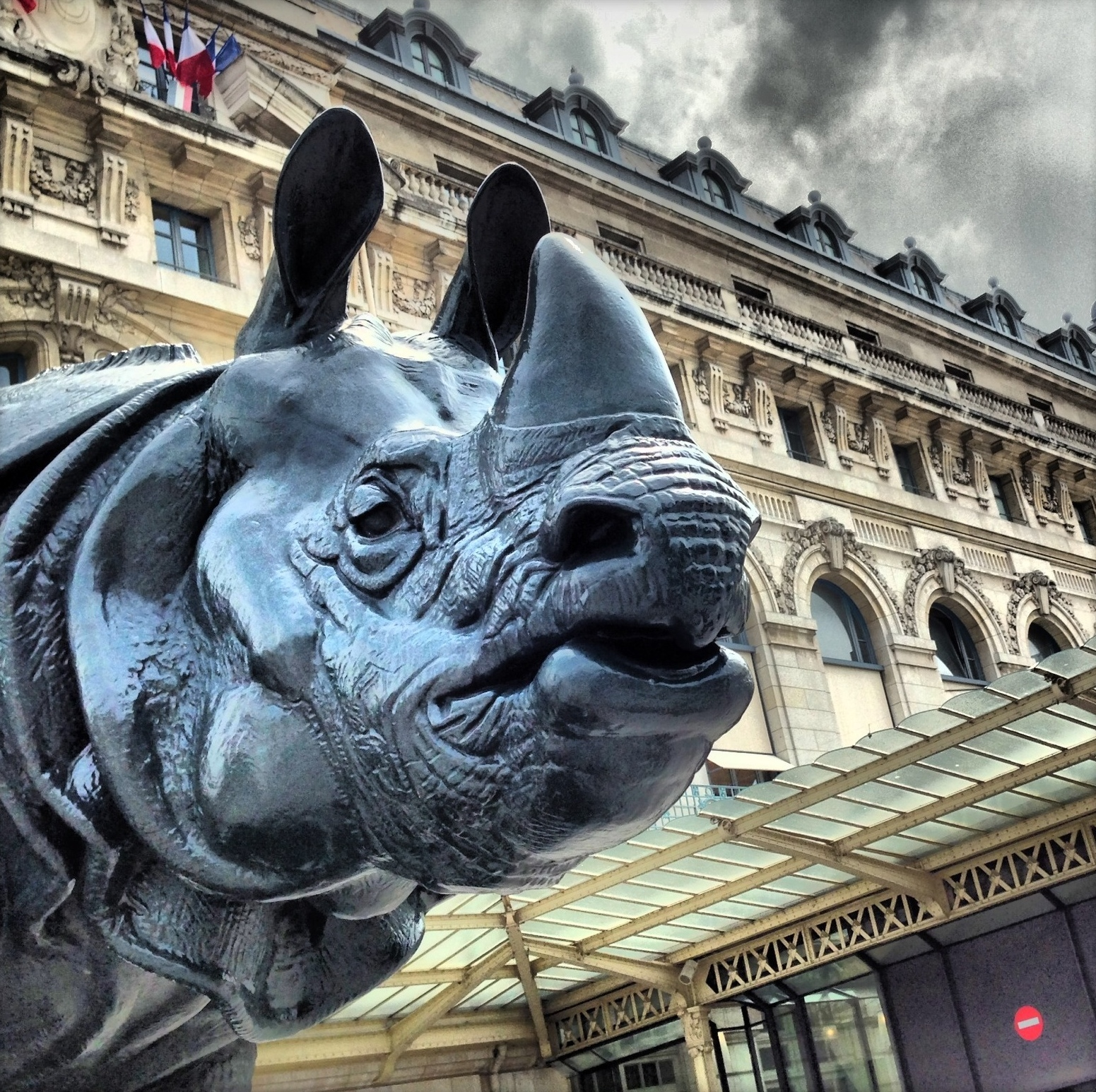
Detail of head

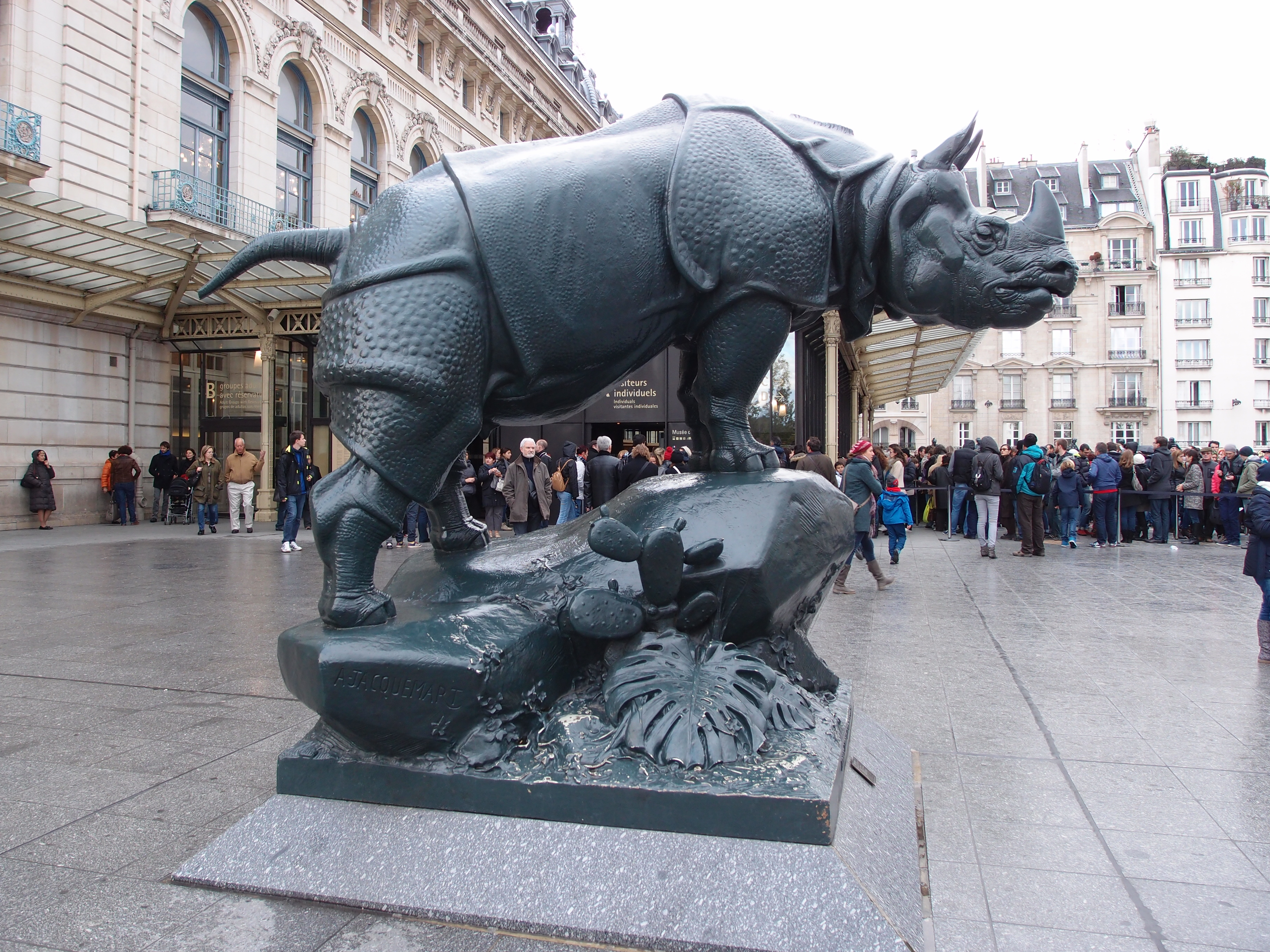
Side view

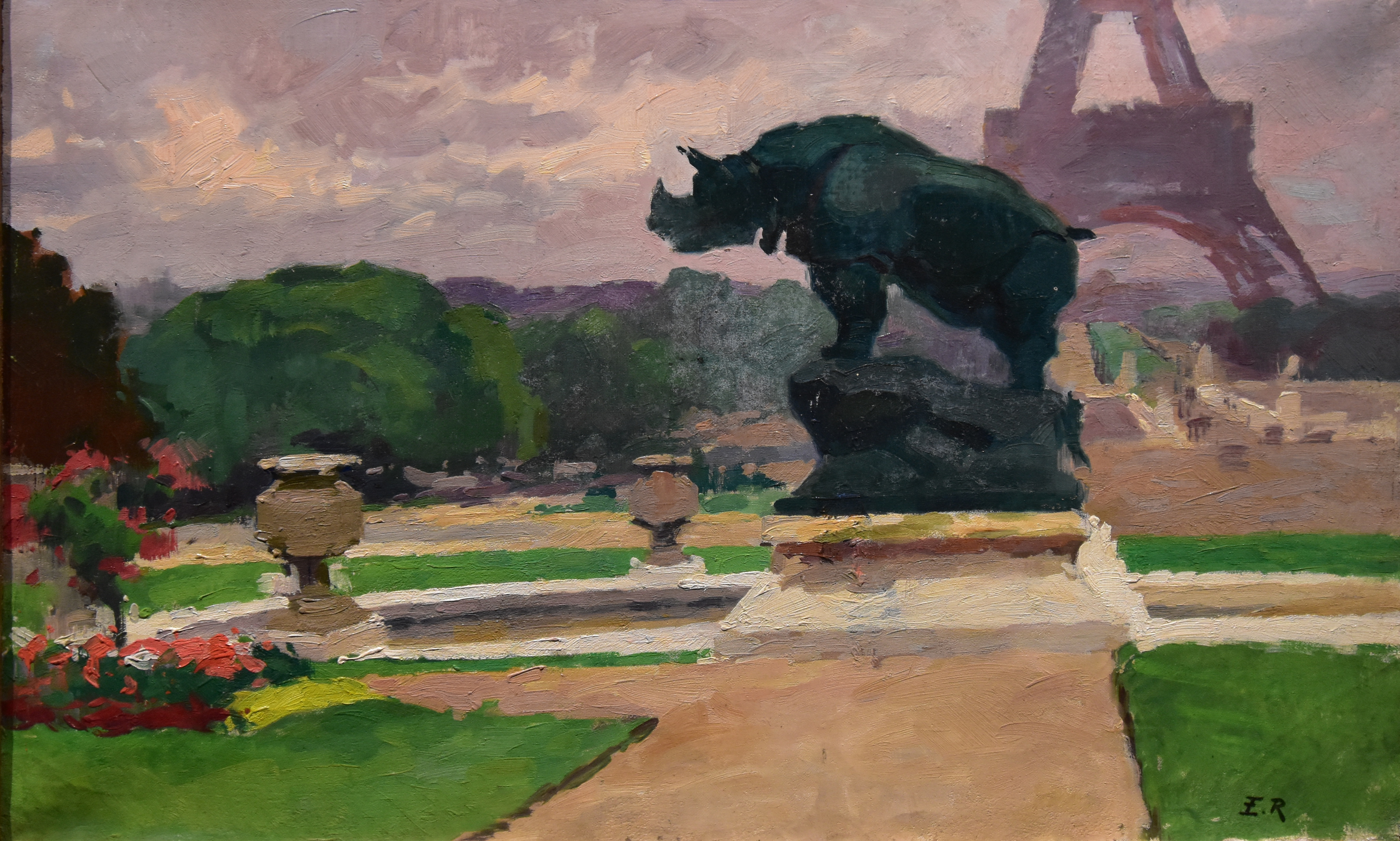
Painting by Ernest Jules Renoux in 1922

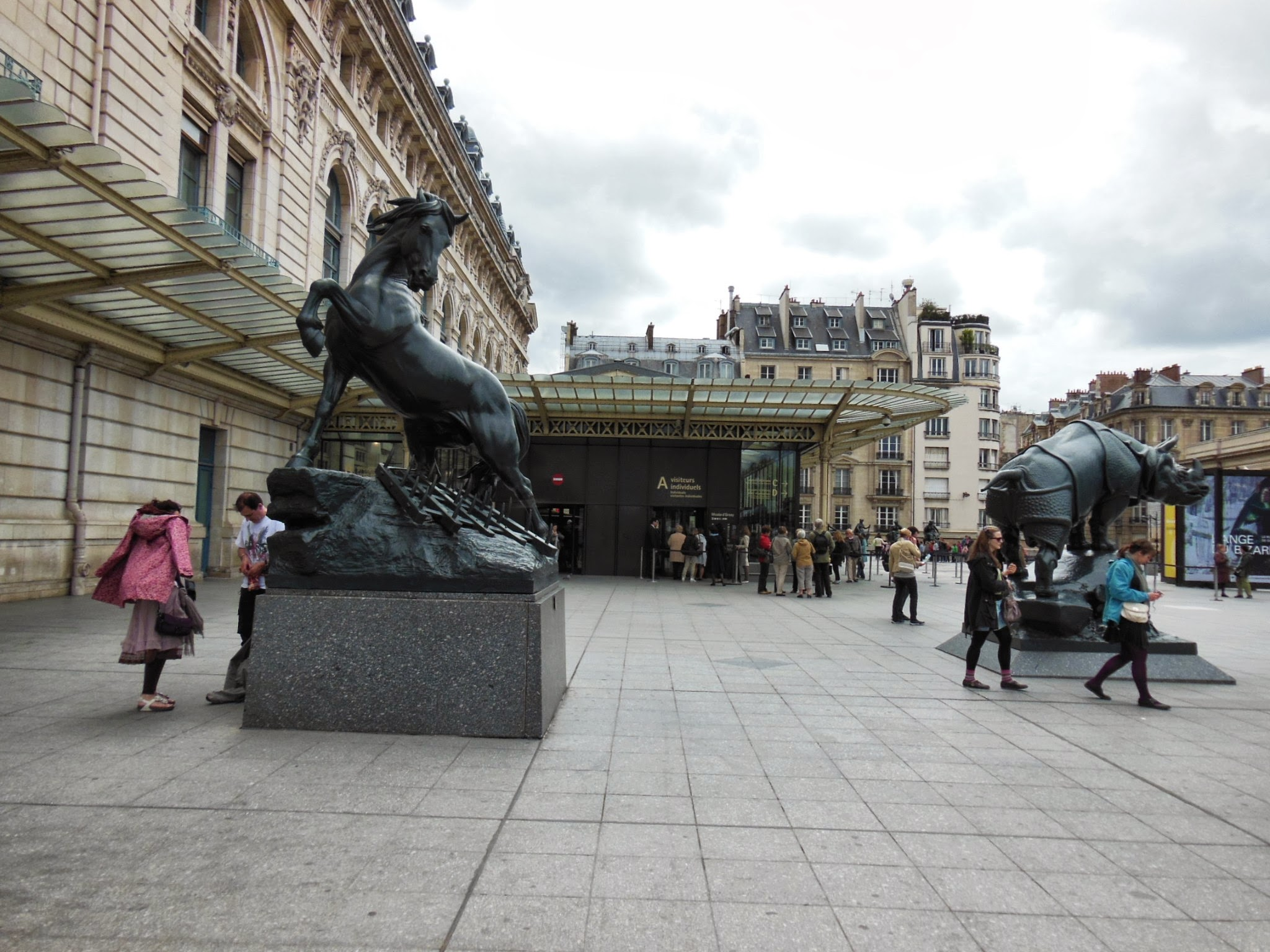
In context with Rouillard's horse
