= Henri Alfred Jacquemart =

French sculptor and painter (1824–1896)

Alfred Jacquemart c.1870s

Henri Alfred Marie Jacquemart (French pronunciation: [ɑ̃ʁi alfʁɛd maʁi ʒakmaʁ]; 24 February 1824 in Paris – 4 January 1896, in Paris), often known as Alfred Jacquemart, was a noted French sculptor and animalier. He usually signed his works: A. Jacquemart.

Jacquemart studied under painter Paul Delaroche and sculptor Jean Baptiste Jules Klagmann. He entered the École des Beaux-Arts in 1845.

Jacquemart exhibited at the Paris Salon from 1847 to 1879, receiving medals in 1857, 1863 and 1865. He traveled in Egypt and Turkey, and was commissioned by the city of Alexandria, Egypt, to create a colossal statue of Muhammad Ali of Egypt.

He sculpted in large, medium and small scale. Many of his works were cast in bronze by the Val d' Osne foundry and some by the silversmith Christofle. Ultimately, however, he earned his reputation for his many larger animal works. In 1870 Jacquemart became a Chevalier of the Légion d'honneur.

Jacquemart died suddenly at his apartment in the Rue de Babylone, Paris on the night of 4 January 1896. His funeral was delayed until 13 January for the arrival of his son, Maurice, who lived in Tunis and was held at the Eglise Saint Thomas d'Aquin, Paris.

== Selected works ==
- Sphinxes (four), La Fontaine du Palmier, Paris, 1858
- Chimera (two), La Fontaine Saint-Michel, Paris, c.1860
- Evangelists (four), Église Saint-Augustin de Paris, 1862
- Valet au chiens (Huntsman and dogs), many castings (see examples below), 1866
- Louis XII on horseback, bas relief Hotel de Ville de Compiegne, 1869
- Viceroy Mohammed Ali, Alexandria, 1872
- Statue of Sakka, Cairo, 1872
- Lions (four), originally meant to stand guard by the statue of Mohammed Ali, but fattened and lengthened by two metres and placed at the opposite entrances of Qasr al-Nil Bridge, Cairo, 1873
- Lions (eight), La Fontaine Place Félix Eboué, Paris, 1874
- Soliman Pasha, Cairo, 1874
- Mohammed Laz-oglou Bey, Cairo, 1874–5
- Rhinocéros, Paris, 1878
Some works of Henri Alfred Marie Jacquemart

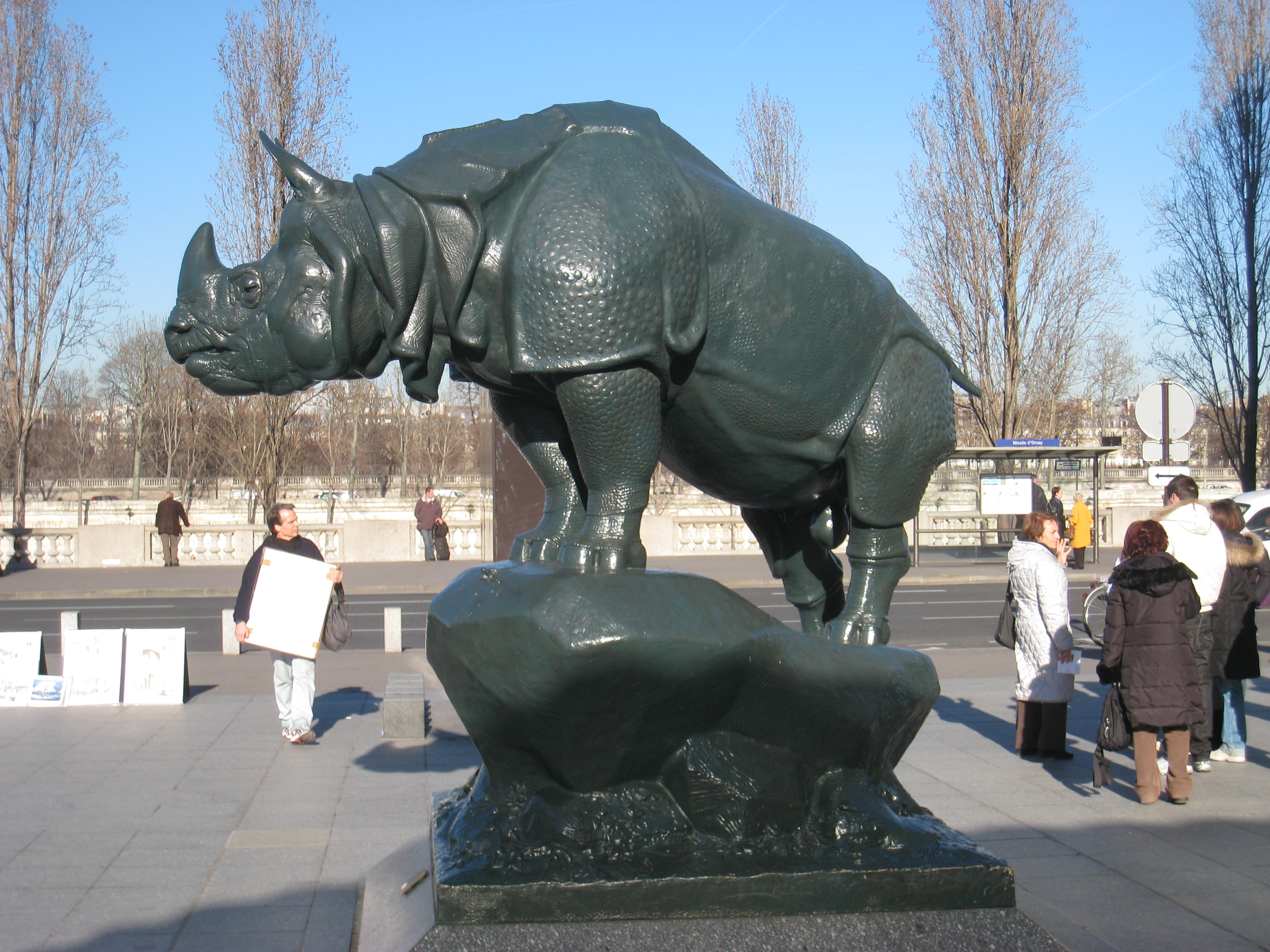
Rhinocéros outside the Musée d'Orsay, Paris

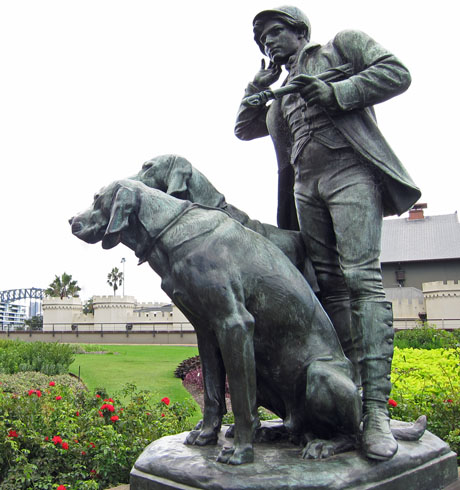
Huntsman and dogs, Botanic Gardens, Sydney

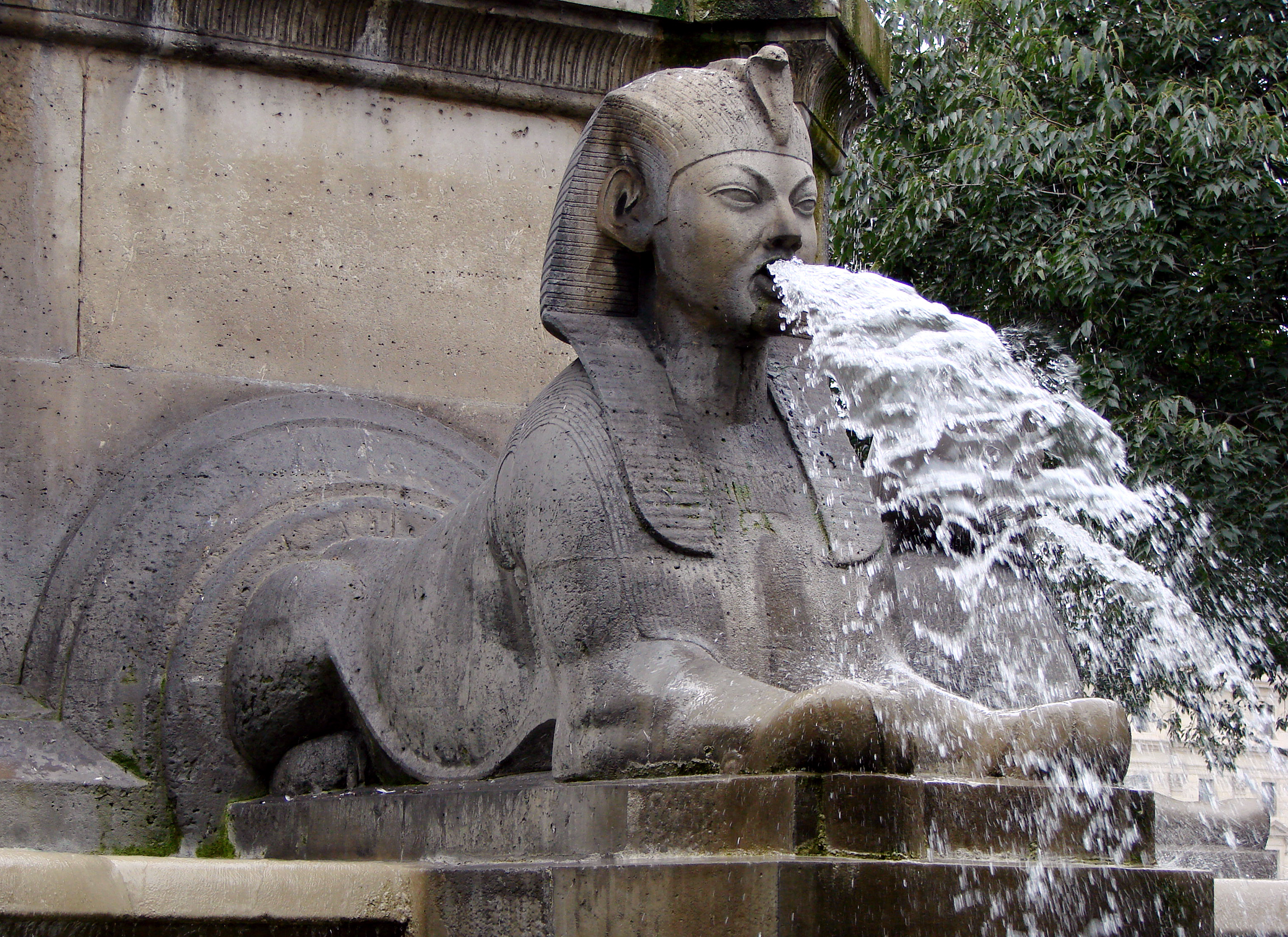
One of the Sphinxes of the Fontaine du Palmier, Paris

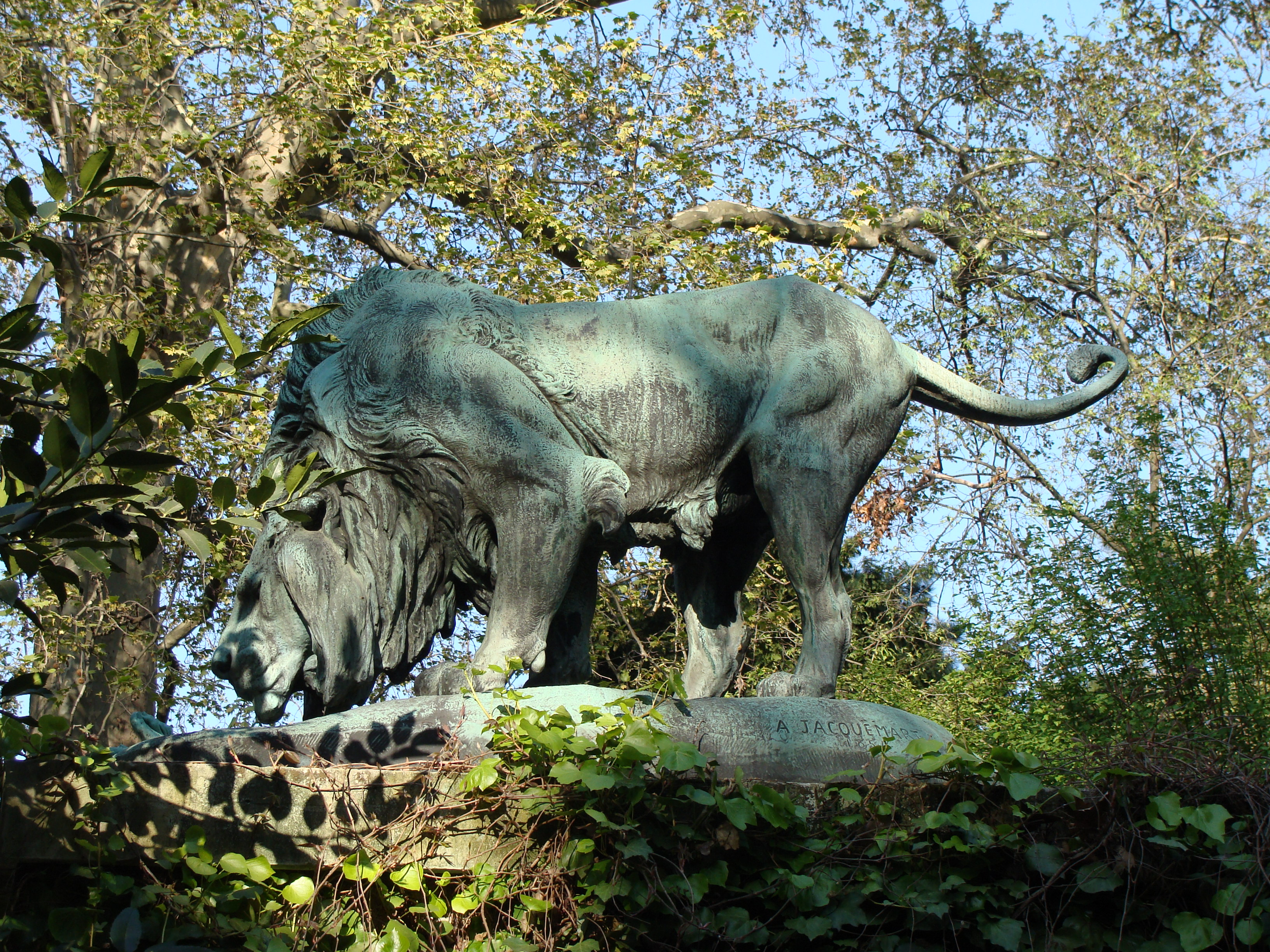
One of the two bronze lions in the Jardin des Plantes, Paris

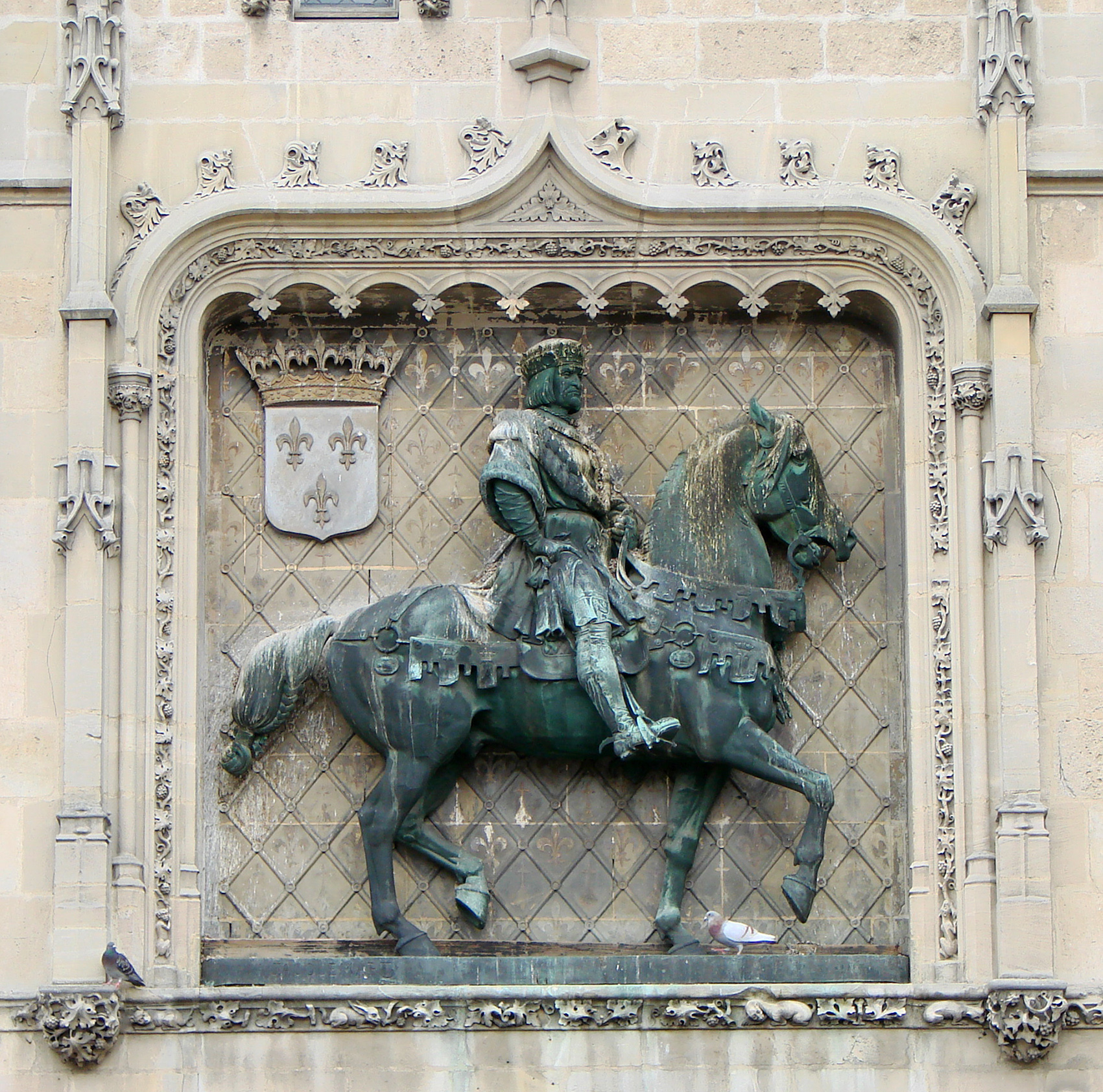
Louis XII bas relief, Town Hall, Compiègne
