= Rhino (photographer) =

American photographer

Chris Rooney, known as Rhino, is a goofy-footed American skateboarder and skate photographer from Boston, MA. Rhino has received critical acclaim for his photography of skateboarding.

== Photography career ==
Rhino got his first photo in Thrasher magazine in 1999. Rhino has been a staff photographer at Thrasher magazine since 2005.
