= Eduard Brendler =

Swedish composer (1800–1831)

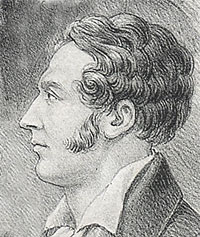
Eduard Brendler

Eduard Brendler (4 November 1800 – 16 August 1831) was a Swedish composer. He was born in Dresden, Germany but his family moved to Sweden when he was only a year old. He died before completing his romantic opera Ryno, or the errant knight ("Ryno eller den vandrande riddaren: skådespel med sång i tre akter"), with a libretto by Bernhard von Beskow, so the opera was completed by his friend and patron the Crown Prince Oscar, and premiered in 1834.
