= Throwbot =

Throwbot may refer to:

- Throwbot (throwable robot), a counter-IED equipment
- Lego Throwbots, a Lego theme 1999–2000
