= Multi-Scale Multidisciplinary Modeling of Electronic Materials Collaborative Research Alliance =

Multi-Scale Multidisciplinary Modeling of Electronic Materials (MSME) Collaborative Research Alliance (CRA) was a research program in the United States that was initiated and sponsored by the US Army Research Laboratory (ARL). The objective of the program was “to develop quantitative understanding of materials from the smallest to the largest relevant scales to advance the state of the art in electronic, optoelectronic and electrochemical materials and devices.”

Collaborative Technology and Research Alliances is a term for partnerships between Army laboratories and centers, private industry and academia for performing research and technology development intended to benefit the US Army. The partnerships are funded by the US Army.

MSME was awarded in 2012. The program was completed in 2016.

== Objectives ==
The objective of this Alliance was to conduct research supporting efforts in future electronic materials and devices for the Army. MSME achieved this through development of fundamental models in electronic materials research. The multiscale models were assembled by the MSME team and the experimentation for validation and verification for these models was performed by ARL scientists in each research area, which was part of a continual process to develop new models through collaboration between ARL and its partners.

== Research Thrusts ==
The MSME program was organized around several research thrusts, which included the following:

- Electrochemical Energy Devices - Focus on interfacial physics and chemistry, ion transport, nanostructures, solid-liquid interface: to include fuel cells, capacitors, etc.
- Hybrid Photonic Devices - Study the interaction of photons, electrons, and phonons, to include photonics, spintronics, plasmonics, etc.
- Heterogeneous Metamorphic Electronics - Examine mixed materials with partial ordering, e.g., graphene, metamaterials, nanoelectronic structures, etc.

== Participants ==
The research under this program was performed collaboratively by the US Army Research Laboratory and by scientists and engineers of the following institutions:

- Army Research Laboratory
- University of Utah
- Boston University
- Rensselaer Polytechnic Institute
