= On-Demand Small Unmanned Aircraft System =

The On-Demand Small Unmanned Aircraft System (ODSUAS) is a custom-tailored, miniature 3D printed drone created by the U.S. Army Research Laboratory (ARL) and Georgia Technical Institute’s Aerospace Systems Design Laboratory. It was designed to provide flexible unmanned aircraft vehicle (UAV) support, where soldiers can input the specific requirements they need, such as size, weight, and endurance, into the mission-planning software before the drone is configured and 3D printed within 24 hours. The process allows the manufacturing of additional drone parts as needed, eliminating the need to carry spare parts for different configurations. While a 3D printer constructs the body of the UAV, the motors, sensors, cameras, propellers, and other apparatus would have to be obtained from a standing inventory.

The device can be tasked for missions involving perimeter surveillance, aerial defense, and reconnaissance. In December 2016, ARL researchers first tested it at Fort Benning, Georgia as part of the Army Expeditionary Warrior Experiments (AEWE) program. The researchers were given feedback s for possible improvements, such as improved agility, noise reduction, and heavier payload capacity. The ODSUAS was shown to demonstrate flight speeds of up to 55 miles per hour.

ARL researchers have stated that the manufacturing of 3D printed drones is only the first step of the project and that the overall goal is to leverage 3D printing as a way to produce mission-specific tools in a short amount of time.
