= PTDS =

PTDS may refer to:

- Polarimetric tornado debris signature
- Persistent Threat Detection System, a type of counter-IED equipment
