= Armor Survivability Kit =

Armor kit for vehicles

The Armor Survivability Kit (ASK) is an armor kit developed by the U.S. Army Research Laboratory (ARL) in 2003 to protect vehicles like the Humvee from small arms, explosive device fragments, and rocket-propelled grenades (RPGs).

== Armor ==
The Armor Survivability Kit consisted of armored steel doors with bullet-proof glass, protective armored plating, and a ballistic windshield and came in either a two-door kit variant (weighing 900 pounds/409 kilograms) or a four-door kit variant (weighing 1,300 pounds/590 kilograms).

== History ==
The ASK was first produced in response to the lack of sufficient armor protecting Humvee vehicles and supply trucks during the war in Iraq and the rising number of deaths caused by improvised explosive devices (IEDs), sniper fire, and rocket-propelled grenade (RPGs).

The Humvee was not designed for active combat and as early as 1996 people inside the Pentagon had called for the army to develop a vehicle to protect soldiers.

Near the beginning of the Iraq war in 2003, the U.S. forces found themselves increasingly vulnerable to guerrilla attacks from roadside bombs and RPGs when driving in Humvees. By February 2004, more than 80 soldiers were killed by roadside bombs since the start of the war; soldiers improved armor but even that was not sufficient. U.S. troops had to rely on improvised vehicle armour and many soldiers resorted to jury-rigging scrap metal onto the doors of unprotected Humvees. At the same time military contractors in Iraq had protected vehicles like the Rhino Runner and the M1117, which had not been approved for procurement. The issue came to public attention when troops preparing to deploy to Iraq challenged Donald Rumsfeld as to why they had to resort to "hillbilly armor" scrounged from junk yards to protect themselves.

In response to the demand, Central Command’s Combined Joint Task Force 7 requested the Tank-Automotive and Armaments Command Research Development and Engineering Center (TARDEC) and ARL to develop a temporary armor kit to install onto unprotected Humvees until more armored vehicles could be shipped to Iraq. Within a week, the engineering team led by Michael J. Zoltoski created the designs for the ASK, which integrated ballistic metals, glass, and ceramics as well as polymers in order to withstand 7.62mm machine gun fire and IEDs.

In October 2003, less than 6 weeks after the initial design was created, 40 ASK prototypes were produced and field-tested at Aberdeen Proving Grounds in Maryland, after which they were ready to be shipped to Iraq along with two installers. By March 2004, 1,924 kits were shipped to Iraq and 1,636 kits were installed onto Humvee vehicles. That year, the Department of Defense rewarded ARL with an innovation award for the development of the ASK. By January 2005, more than 9,400 kits were reportedly delivered to soldiers in both Iraq and Afghanistan.

The ASK also served as a precursor to the development of the Fragmentary Armor or Frag Kits for armored vehicles in 2004.

While the introduction of ASKs onto unprotected Humvees did offer passengers more protection, other issues with the vehicle began to appear. The armor was still not sufficient to protect passengers from IEDs, which by that time were destroying even heavily armored vehicles. Also, due to the hot summer temperature in Iraq, occupants began to develop heat-related illnesses due to the heat buildup inside the vehicle. To resolve this problem, an air-conditioning system was installed inside many of the Humvees fitted with the ASKs. In addition, the additional weight brought on by the ASKs and other heavy armor plating increased the likelihood of the vehicle rolling over during serious accidents, which were sometimes fatal. From March 2003 through November 2005, an analysis of the U.S. Army’s ground-accident database found that 60 of the 85 soldiers who died in Humvee accidents in Iraq were killed when the vehicle rolled.
