= Army Research Office =

Office within the United States Department of the Army

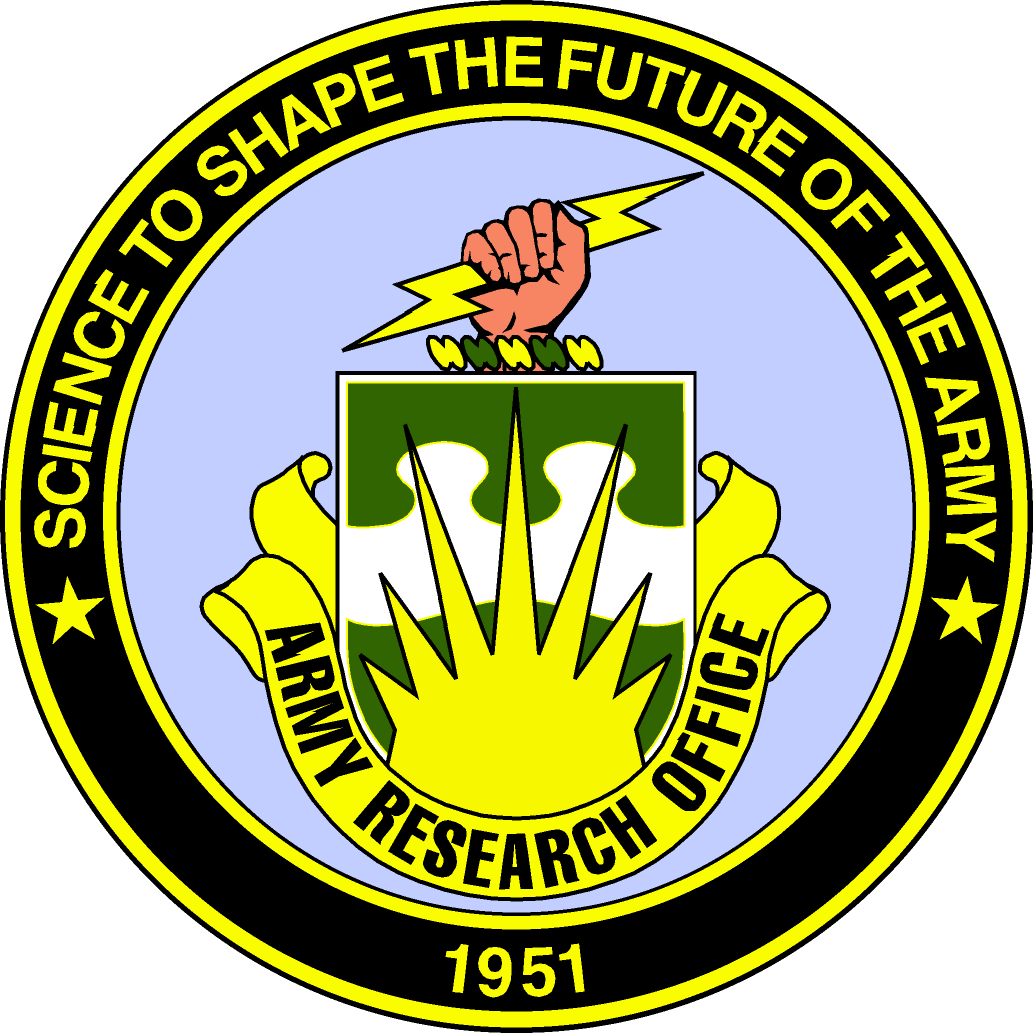
- Abbreviation: ARO
- Formation: 1951; 75 years ago
- Type: Military research directorate
- Parent organization: DEVCOM Army Research Laboratory

The Army Research Office (ARO) is a directorate within the U.S. Army Combat Capabilities Development Command Army Research Laboratory (DEVCOM ARL) responsible for managing the Army’s extramural research program. Originally a standalone organization assigned under the Office of the Chief of Research and Development, ARO was consolidated into DEVCOM ARL in 1998.

Based in Research Triangle Park, North Carolina, ARO competitively selects and sponsors basic research proposals from educational institutions, nonprofit organizations, and private industry, principally in the form of single investor efforts, university-affiliated research centers, and specially tailored outreach programs. The directorate also manages the Army’s Small Business Technology Transfer Program and Historically Black Colleges and Universities/Minority Serving Institutions Programs.

== Mission ==
ARO's research mission concentrates on the pursuit of scientific discoveries that uncover new Army capabilities with the transition of system applications often envisioned 20 to 30 years in the future, representing the Army’s most long-range view.

== History ==
Prior to its assignment under DEVCOM ARL, ARO existed as a separate U.S. Army agency for over 40 years. Its creation was largely influenced by a prevailing military policy following World War II to separate research and development from production. Since the beginning of the 19th century, the Army’s production facilities served as the primary source of technological innovation for the Army. With few exceptions, weapons research and development took place alongside arms production within the network of manufacturing arsenals owned by the Army. The close proximity of Army research and development to Army production suddenly came to an end when the United States entered World War II, and the pressure to accelerate the mass production of weapons forced the arsenals to relinquish most of their long-range basic research to the private sector. In 1941, President Franklin D. Roosevelt signed an executive order that established the Office of Scientific Research and Development (OSRD), which promptly administered federal funds for military-relevant basic research to universities and industrial laboratories.

Although OSRD was closed down after the war, OSRD director and President Roosevelt’s wartime science advisor Vannevar Bush strongly endorsed the continued organizational separation of research and development from production. Bush believed that the private sector represented the future of scientific advancement and that the primary source of technological innovation for the nation should reside in universities and research institutes instead of government agencies. Several senior Army officials held similar views and saw the potential in outsourcing research and development to universities and other private-sector institutions. In 1946, Major General Gladeon Barnes, the Ordnance Corps’ director of research and development, supported a plan that allocated only one-third of the funds for research and development requested annually from Congress to the Army’s arsenals and proving grounds and allotted the remaining two-thirds to contracts with outside research institutions.

The success of OSRD in mobilizing the private sector to develop critical wartime inventions like the atomic bomb and the microwave radar also swayed key leaders in the armed services to establish new organizations that served a similar purpose. Shortly after the U.S. Navy founded the Office of Naval Research in 1946, the Ordnance Corps established the Office of Ordnance Research (OOR) in Durham, North Carolina, in June 1951. Situated in Faculty House 2 on the campus of Duke University and designated as a Class II military installation, OOR functioned as the central office for handling basic research programs sponsored by the Ordnance Corps. The agency consisted of four main divisions pertaining to chemistry, mathematics, engineering, and physics, and focused on five principal areas: exploratory, ballistics, materials and construction, combustion, and friction and wear. In September 1951, OOR sponsored its first technical paper, a study on heat flow by a Wayne State University researcher, and initiated a total of 88 projects by the end of the year. The early success of OOR soon prompted the Army Scientific Advisory Panel, a committee of 12 advisors formed by then–Secretary of the Army Frank Pace Jr., to lobby for the creation of an agency that applied OOR’s practices to all Army-sponsored research. As a result, the Army relocated the U.S. Army Research and Development Field Office to Arlington, Virginia, and formally reestablished it as the U.S. Army Research Office in March 1958, less than a year after the field office was originally established at Fort Belvoir, Virginia. Positioned under the Office of the Chief of Research and Development, ARO became responsible for planning and directing the Army’s research program, coordinating research plans with other U.S. military and government agencies, and acting as the main Army point of contact for the nation’s scientific community.

Despite the introduction of ARO in this capacity, the Ordnance Corps retained control over how it allocated its resources for research and development to the private sector through its command of the Office of Ordnance Research. In a prelude to the Army reorganization of 1962, however, this institutional leverage was lost when the Army transferred OOR from the jurisdiction of the Chief of Ordnance to the Chief of Research and Development and renamed it the U.S. Army Research Office–Durham (ARO-D) in January 1961. In July 1961, ARO became responsible for all external basic research in the Army and its technical services. The Durham office in North Carolina managed Army interests in mathematics, chemistry, physics, engineering, and metallurgy, and the Arlington office in Virginia managed Army interests in the life sciences, psychology, the social sciences, and earth science. In addition, the Army had established research and development offices outside of the United States during the 1950s to broaden its research base to the international scientific community. The U.S. Army R&D Group (Europe) was stationed at Frankfurt, Germany, in April 1956, and the U.S. Army Far East Research Office was stationed at Camp Zama, Japan, in March 1959. Upon the designation of ARO’s new responsibility, the former was renamed ARO–Frankford and the latter was renamed ARO–Tokyo.

By 1968, ARO consisted of nine organizational elements: the Physical and Engineering Sciences Division, the Life Sciences Division, the Environment Sciences Division, the Behavioral Sciences Division, the Studies and Analysis Division, the Science and Technical Information Division, the Research Programs Office, the Research Plans Office, and the Operations Research Group. In 1973, the Army disestablished the Army Research Office in Arlington (sometimes referred to by the misnomer Army Research Office–Washington, or ARO-W) and redesignated ARO-D as simply the Army Research Office (ARO). This change effectively made the Durham office ARO’s official headquarters. Furthermore, the Army set into motion the plan to relocate ARO from the campus of Duke University to a newly constructed building in Research Triangle Park, North Carolina. ARO formally left the Duke University campus and moved to Research Triangle Park in the spring of 1975.

When the U.S. Army Materiel Command (AMC) officially activated the U.S. Army Laboratory Command (LABCOM) in July 1985, ARO was among the eight major Army elements placed under LABCOM operational control. ARO, however, not only kept its traditional role under LABCOM, but it also retained its ability to interact directly with AMC Headquarters and the Assistant Secretary of the Army for Research, Development, and Acquisition. While ARO managed the majority of the basic research program for the Army during this period, a portion of the Army’s funding for basic research was also channeled to the AMC laboratories and Research, Development, and Engineering (RDE) centers. ARO directed most of the funding it received for basic research toward short- and long-term programs with universities. The ARO research program consisted of the following divisions: Electronics, Physics, Chemistry and Biology, Engineering, Material Science, Mathematics, and Geosciences.

Several years after the U.S. Army Research Laboratory emerged as a successor to LABCOM, ARO officially joined ARL in 1998. This realignment led to the ARO Director becoming the ARL Deputy Director for basic research and adopting the responsibility of coordinating all basic research at ARL, including those in-house.

In 2022, ARL (redesignated as U.S. Army Combat Capabilities Development Command Army Research Laboratory, or DEVCOM ARL, in 2020) adopted a competency-based organizational structure that reassigned ARO as one of the laboratory’s three directorates. This three-directorate structure was designed to support a competency-based organizational structure that realigned the laboratory’s intramural and extramural research efforts to underscore the Army’s targeted priorities in science and technology. By this point, ARO’s operations were consigned to planning, organizing, and managing the Army’s extramural basic research through DEVCOM ARL.

== Research ==
ARO executes its extramural basic research in the following scientific disciplines: chemical sciences, computing sciences, electronics, life sciences, material science, mathematical sciences, mechanical sciences, network sciences, and physics. The ARO Core Research Program represents the primary mechanism that the directorate uses to solicit and conduct long-term basic research. This mechanism seeks out research proposals from educational institutions, nonprofit organizations, and commercial organizations that support one or multiple DEVCOM ARL Competencies and advance Army priorities.

In addition to the ARO Core Research Program, ARO manages University Affiliated Research Centers (UARCs) for the U.S. Army. ARO is the primary sponsor for the Institute for Soldier Nanotechnologies at the Massachusetts Institute of Technology and the Institute for Collaborative Biotechnologies at the University of California, Santa Barbara, as well as a co-manager for the Institute for Creative Technologies at the University of Southern California. ARO also manages DEVCOM ARL’s Foundational Research Centers, which foster research and collaboration in specific areas of strategic importance to U.S. national security. The Army Center for Synthetic Biology promotes basic research in specific areas of synthetic biology, the Army Ultra-Wide Bandgap RF Electronics Center specializes in basic research that accelerates the development of advanced RF electronics, and the Army Energetics Basic Research Center generates knowledge in novel energetic materials.

Furthermore, under the oversight of the Office of the Secretary of Defense, ARO co-manages the University Research Initiative alongside the Air Force Office of Scientific Research and the Office of Naval Research. ARO can award funding to multidisciplinary research teams as part of the Multidisciplinary University Research Initiative (MURI) program, as well as facilitate the conferment of awards for the Presidential Early Career Award for Scientists and Engineers (PECASE) program and the Defense University Research Implementation Program (DURIP).

== Nobel Laureates ==
Army funding provided by ARO’s extramural research programs contributed to numerous scientific and technological achievements that later received global acclaim through the bestowal of the Nobel Prize. Nobel Prize laureates whose pivotal research received funding from ARO include the following recipients:

- Charles H. Townes: The Nobel Prize in Physics in 1964
- John Bardeen: The Nobel Prize in Physics in 1972
- Leon N. Cooper: The Nobel Prize in Physics in 1972
- Robert Schrieffer: The Nobel Prize in Physics in 1972
- Leo Esaki: The Nobel Prize in Physics in 1973
- Brian D. Josephson: The Nobel Prize in Physics in 1973
- William Lipscomb: The Nobel Prize in Chemistry in 1976
- Herbert C. Brown: The Nobel Prize in Chemistry in 1979
- Arthur L. Schawlow: The Nobel Prize in Physics in 1981
- Nicolaas Bloembergen: The Nobel Prize in Physics in 1981
- Hans G. Dehmelt: The Nobel Prize in Physics in 1989
- Richard E. Smalley: The Nobel Prize in Chemistry in 1996
- Robert F. Curl Jr.: The Nobel Prize in Chemistry in 1996
- Daniel C. Tsui: The Nobel Prize in Physics in 1998
- Alan Heeger: The Nobel Prize in Chemistry in 2000
- Alan MacDiarmid: The Nobel Prize in Chemistry in 2000
- Herbert Kroemer: The Nobel Prize in Physics in 2000
- Eric Cornell: The Nobel Prize in Physics in 2001
- Wolfgang Ketterle: The Nobel Prize in Physics in 2001
- Carl Weiman: The Nobel Prize in Physics in 2001
- Linda B. Buck: The Nobel Prize in Physiology or Medicine in 2004
- Robert H. Grubbs: The Nobel Prize in Chemistry in 2005
- David J. Wineland: The Nobel Prize in Physics in 2012
- Frances H. Arnold: The Nobel Prize in Chemistry in 2018
- Gérard Mourou: The Nobel Prize in Physics in 2018
- Ferenc Krausz: The Nobel Prize in Physics in 2023
- Moungi Bawendi: The Nobel Prize in Chemistry in 2023

== See also ==
- U.S. Army Combat Capabilities Development Command Army Research Laboratory (DEVCOM ARL)
- Air Force Office of Scientific Research
- Office of Naval Research
