= Institute for Collaborative Biotechnologies =

Research institute at the University of California, Santa Barbara

The Institute for Collaborative Biotechnologies
- Abbreviation: ICB
- Formation: 2003
- Founded at: University of California, Santa Barbara
- Purpose: biotechnology

The Institute for Collaborative Biotechnologies (ICB) is a University Affiliated Research Center (UARC) primarily funded by the United States Army. Headquartered at the University of California, Santa Barbara (UCSB) and in collaboration with the Massachusetts Institute of Technology, Caltech, and industry partners, ICB's interdisciplinary approach to research aims to enhance military technology by transforming biological systems into technological applications.

== Founding ==
UARC proposed the ICB's development in January 2003 and the institute came to fruition by August 22, 2003 with the US Army's announcement to grant $50 million for military research. Since that time, the ICB has remained intact and expanded to include 60 faculty members and 150 researchers that have completed over 135 research projects.

== Research ==
The ICB's research aim is to model biological mechanisms for use in military materials and tools. Quoting Army Research Office program manager Robert Campbell, "The inspiration for the ICB comes from the fact that biology uses different mechanisms to produce materials and integrated circuits for high-performance sensing, computing and information processing, and actuation than are presently used in human manufacturing." Much research is focused on evaluating biomolecular sensors, bio-inspired materials and energy, biodiscovery tools, bio-inspired network science, and cognitive neuroscience through the disciplines of cellular and molecular biology, materials science, chemical engineering, mechanical engineering, and psychology.

== Leadership ==
=== Present ===
Francis J. Doyle III, ICB Director

Scott Grafton, ICB Associate Director

David Gay, ICB Director of Technology

Robert Kokoska, ICB Army Program Manager

=== Past ===
Daniel Morse, Founding Director

== Affiliates ==
The ICB is affiliated with the following:

=== Army Partners ===
- Aviation & Missile Research, Development & Engineering Center (AMRDEC)
- Army Research Laboratory (ARL)
- Army Research Office (ARO)
- Communication-Electronics Research Development & Engineering Center (CERDEC)
- Edgewood Chemical Biological Center (ECBC)
- Engineer Research & Development Center (ERDC)
- Medical Research & Materiel Command (MRMC)
- Natick Soldier Research, Development & Engineering Center (NSRDEC)
- Tank Automotive Research, Development & Engineering Center (TARDEC)
- Training and Doctrine Command (TRADOC ARCIC)

=== Industry Partners ===
- The Aerospace Corporation
- Cynvenio Biosystems, LLC
- CytomX, Inc.
- General Atomics
- Innovative Micro Technologies
- Integrated Diagnostics
- Lockheed Martin
- Raytheon Vision Systems
- SAIC
- Sirigen
- Spectrafluidics
- Teledyne Scientific Company
- Toyon Research Corporation
- United Technologies Research Center

== Controversy ==
In 2008, S.B. Antiwar protested ICB's annual military conference by blocking UCSB's Pardall Tunnel, the main path and bikeway between the campus and city of Isla Vista. Between 200 and 300 students and community members participated and a total of three arrests were made. The conference area was then secured by campus police and the event continued as planned. The ICB has continued to hold conferences at UCSB each year without incident.
