= Counter-IED equipment =

Type of military equipment

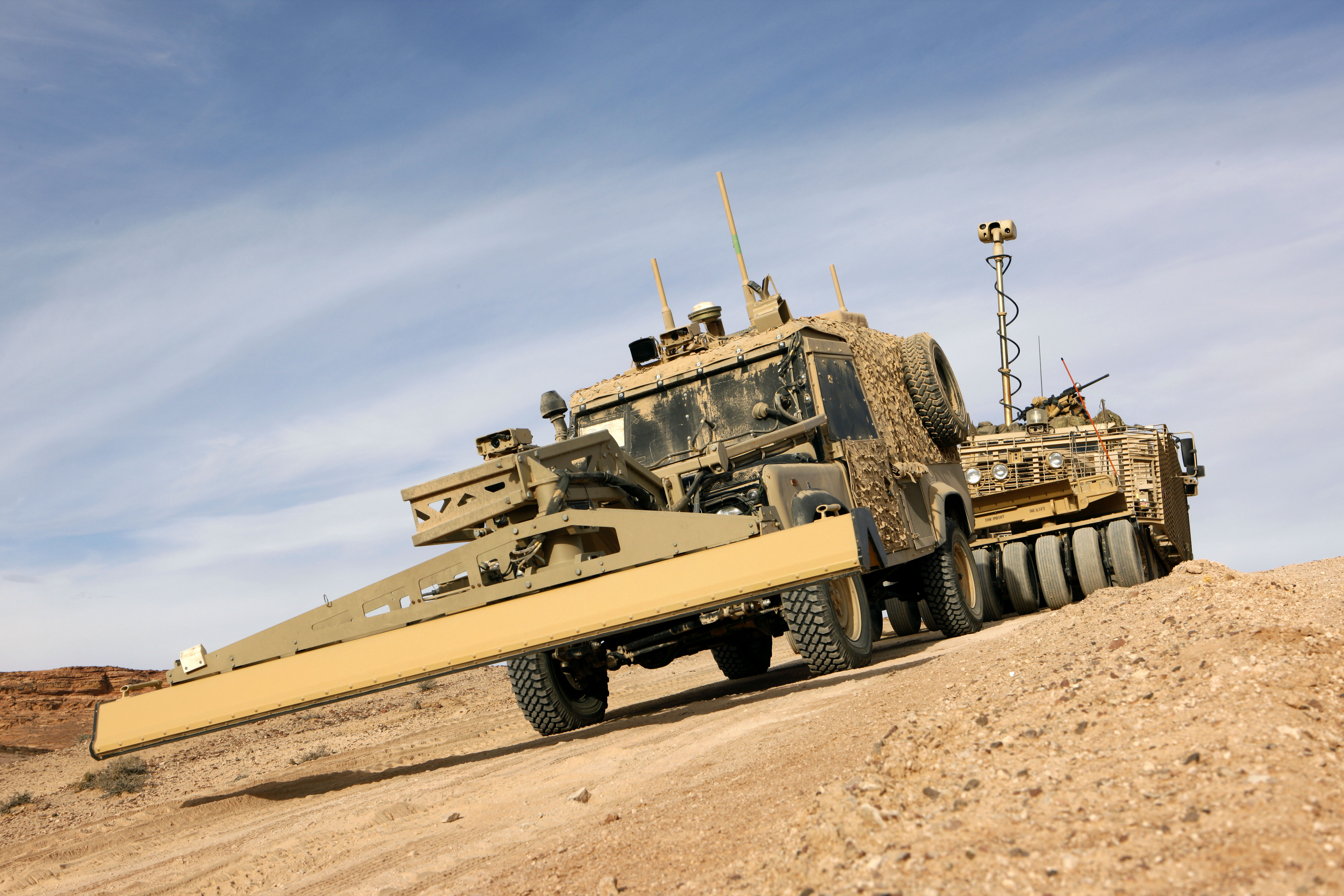
Remote-control "Panama" Land Rover with ground-penetrating radar to detect IEDs followed by Mastiff with Choker mine rollers

Counter-IED equipment are created primarily for military and law enforcement. They are used for standoff detection of explosives and explosive precursor components and defeating the Improvised Explosive Devices (IEDs) devices themselves as part of a broader counter-terrorism, counter-insurgency, or law enforcement effort.

== Requirements ==
Detection techniques and specific systems with assessed Technological Readiness Levels (TRLs) are described by both capabilities and characteristics.

A list of detection techniques and systems' capabilities include:

- detection rate of explosives and/or explosive precursor components
- the false positive rate
- the effective range
- the detection depths in various soils
- foliage penetration capability
- type of explosive and/or explosive precursor component that the system is capable of detecting (metal, non-metal, radio controlled, etc.)
- impacts of different types of weather
- processing time
- day/night capability

A description of the characteristics includes:

- size
- weight
- power
- directionality
- approximate cost
- reliability
- mean time to repair (MTTR)
- availability of components
- intellectual property issues

Also of concern are any hazard identifications, the impact of each system and/or technique on DOTMLPF-P, and acquisition recommendations.

== Robots ==
Talon: The TALON transmits in color, black and white, infrared, and/or night vision to its operator, who may be up to 1,000 m away. It can run off lithium-ion batteries for a maximum of 7 days on standby independently before needing recharging. It has an 8.5 hour battery life at normal operating speeds, 2 standard lead batteries providing 2 hours each and 1 optional Lithium Ion providing an additional 4.5 hours. It weighs less than 100 lb (45 kg) or 60 lb (27 kg) for the Reconnaissance version. Its cargo bay accommodates a variety of sensor payloads. The robot is controlled through a two-way radio or a Fiber-optic link from a portable or wearable Operator Control Unit (OCU) that provides continuous data and video feedback for precise vehicle positioning. The (IED/EOD) TALON Carries sensors and a robotic manipulator, which is used by the U.S. Military for explosive ordnance disposal and disarming improvised explosive devices.

Small Unmanned Ground Vehicle (SUGV): SUGVs are lightweight, rugged, specialized systems suitable for military applications in congested urban settings to give users the ability to see around corners and into tight spaces.

Packbot: The PackBot is a series of military robots by iRobot.

Throwbots: Throwbots (from "throwable robot") are rugged, highly portable, and instantly and easily deployable reconnaissance robots.

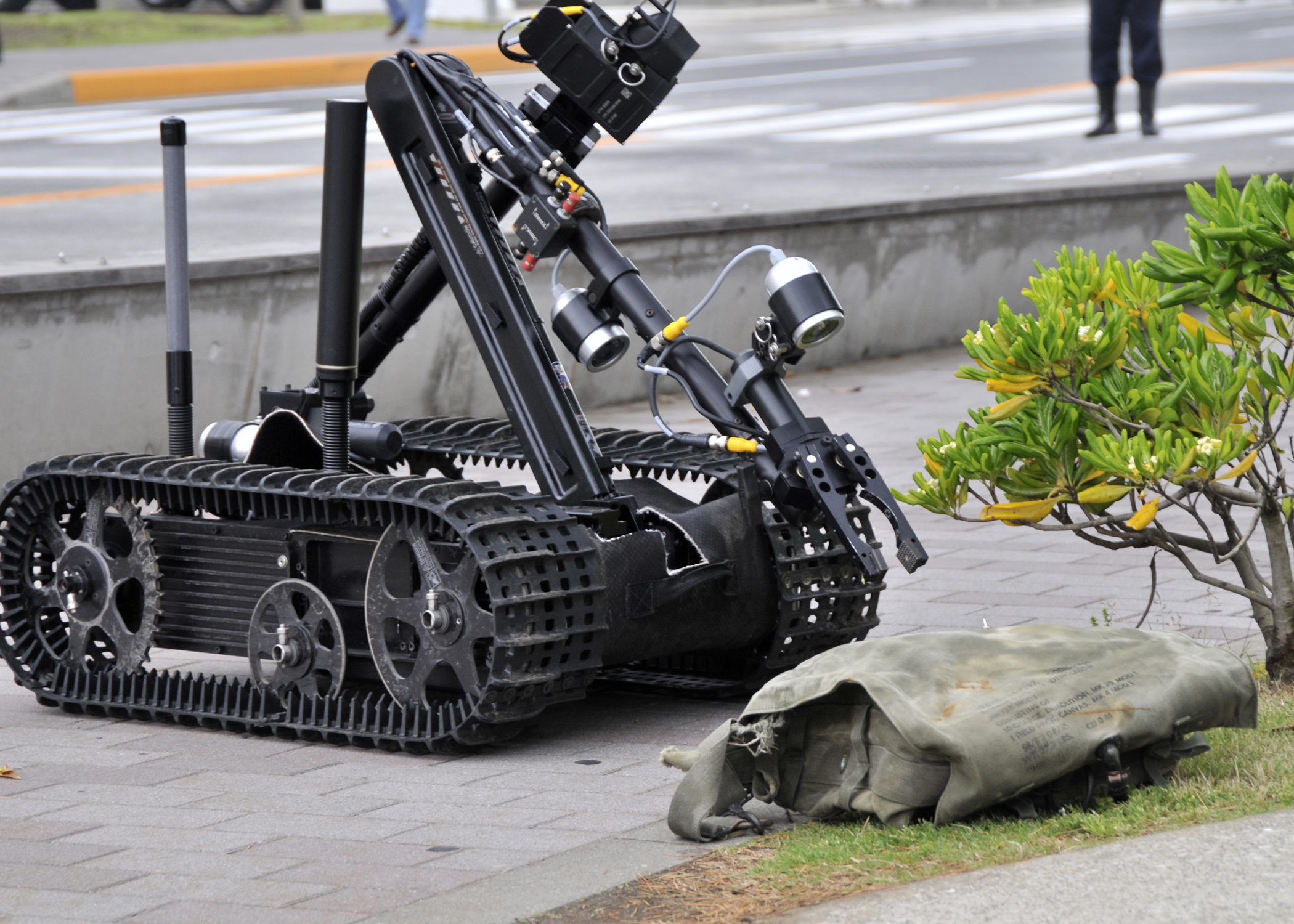
US Navy 090512-N-2013O-013 A Mark II Talon robot from Explosive Ordnance Disposal Mobile Unit 5, Det. Japan, is used to inspect a suspicious package during a force protection-anti-terrorism training exercise.

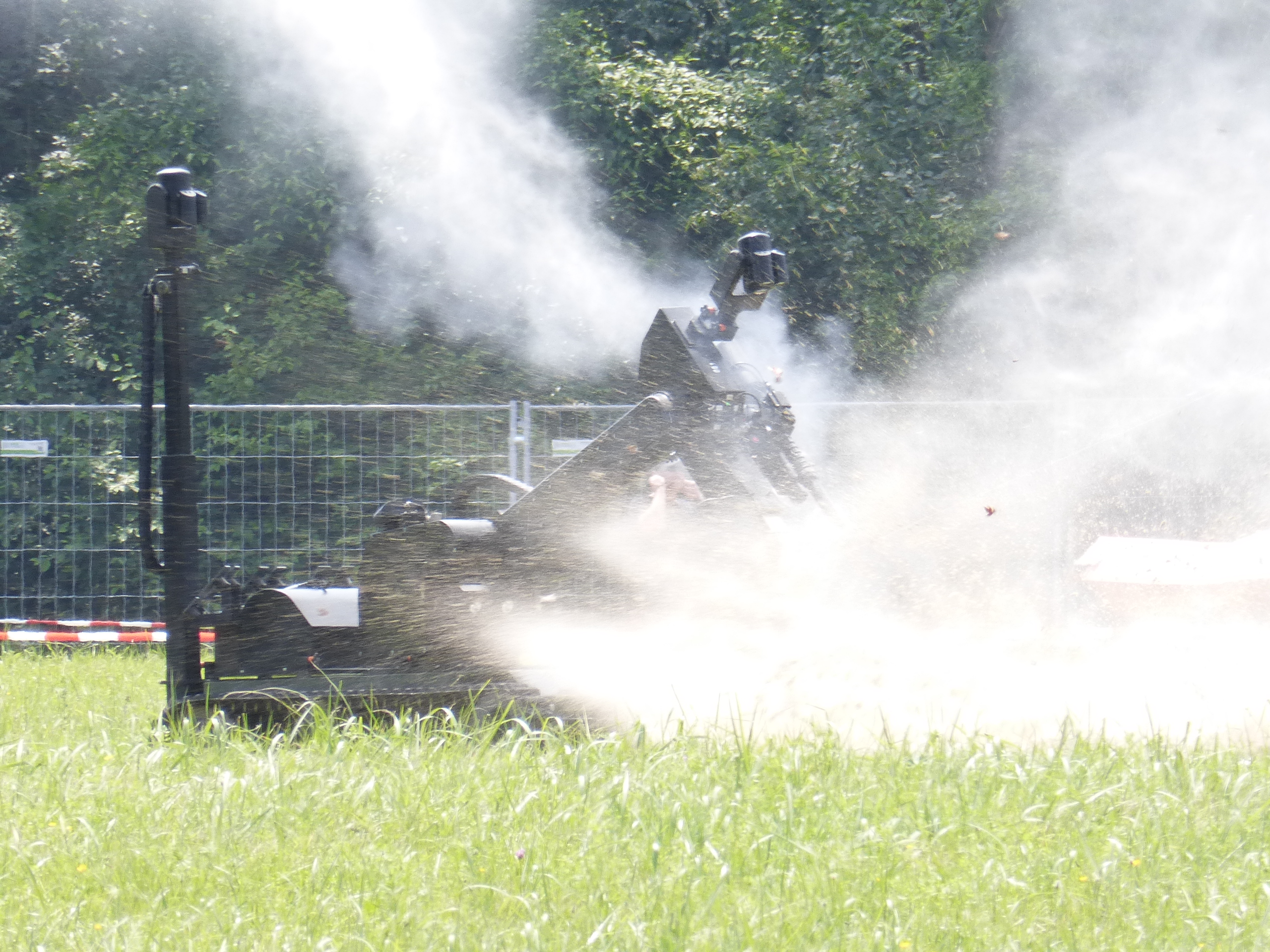
Bomb disposal robot "tEODor" of the German Bundeswehr destroying an IED dummy

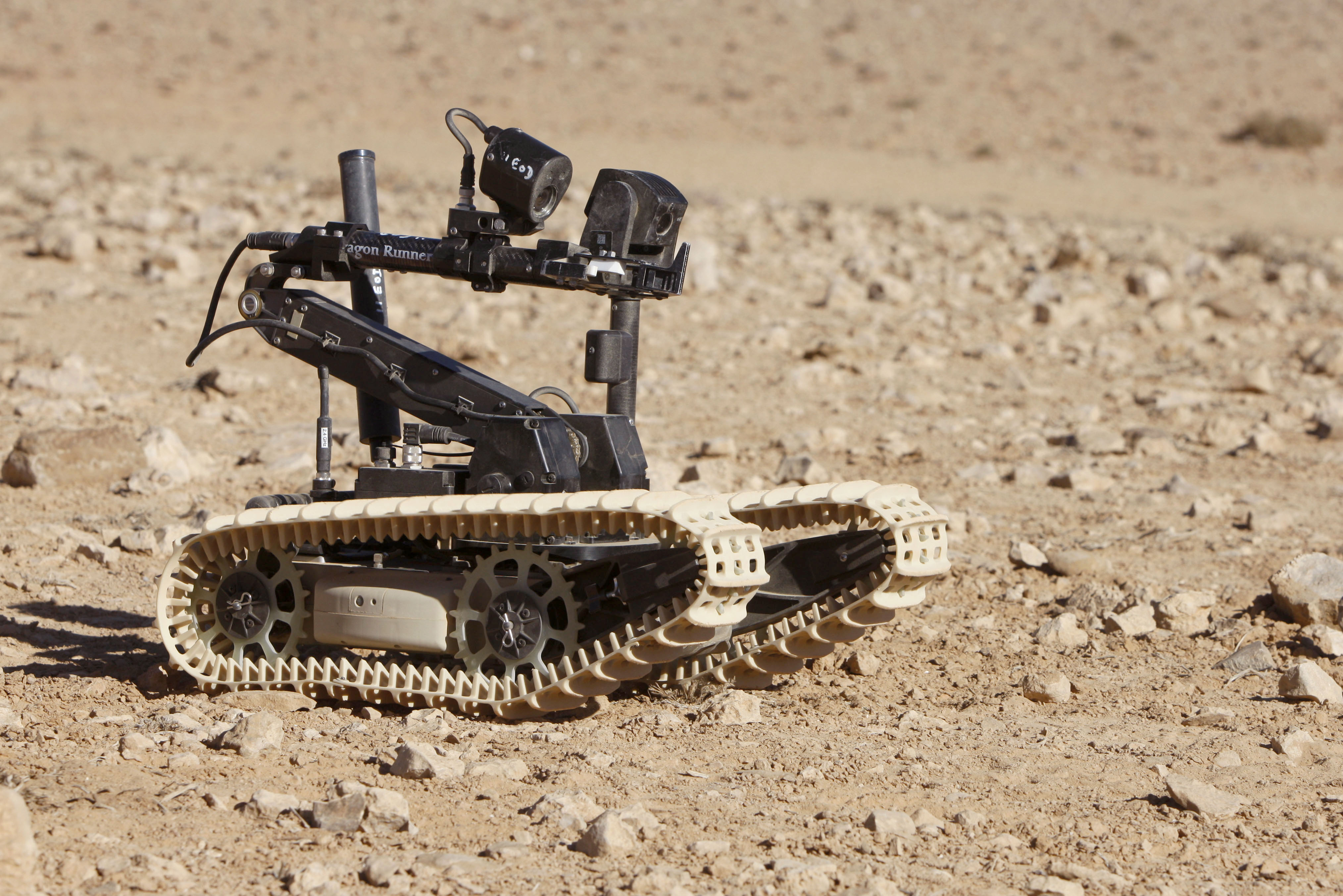
Dragon Runner robot on exercise with the British Army in 2012

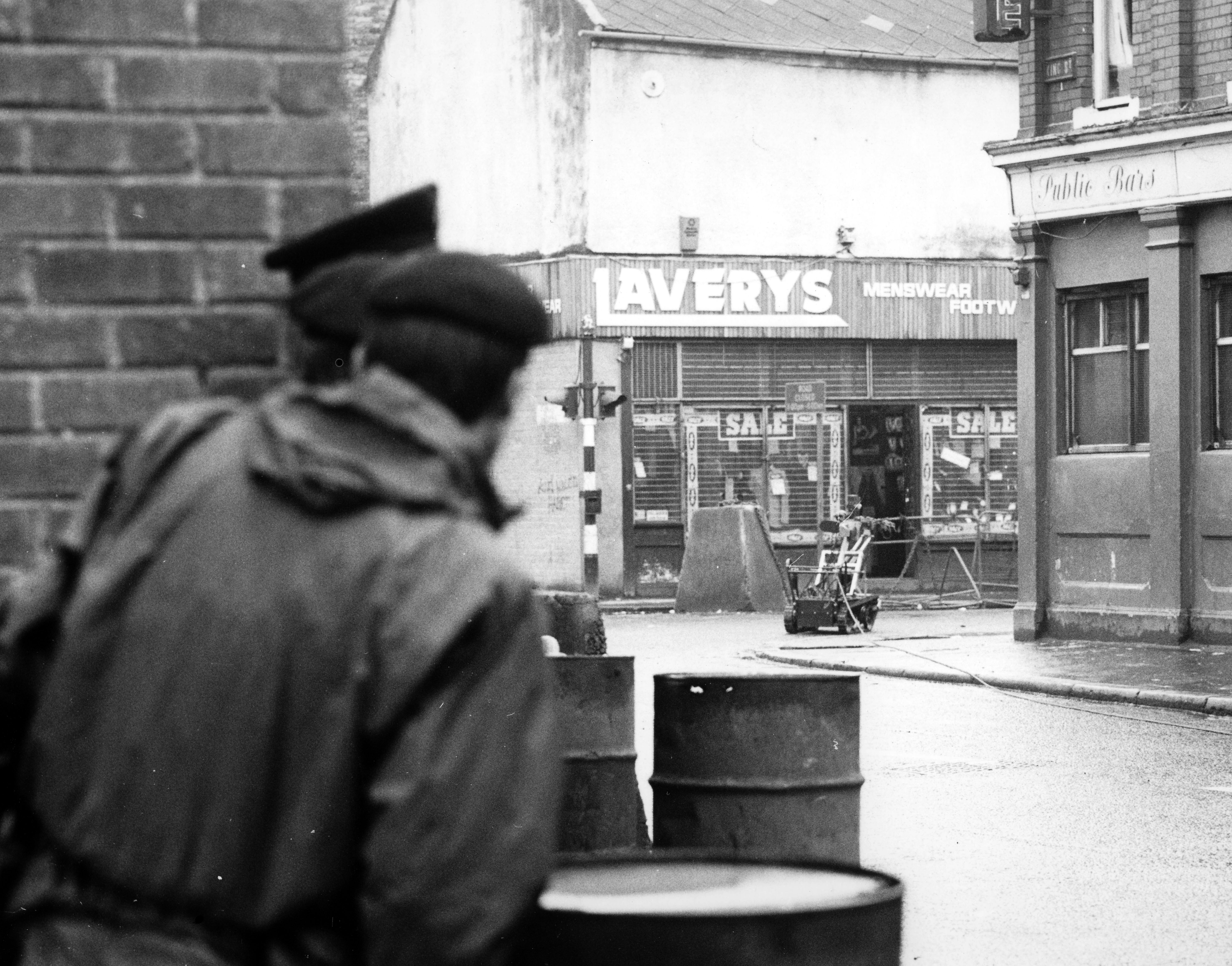
Wheelbarrow robot on the streets of Northern Ireland in 1978

== Soldier-worn protection ==
Body Armor: Soldiers, Sailors, Airmen, and Marines have a large assortment of wearable protection against the effects of blasts and shrapnel. There have been many advancements made in ergonomics, blast resistant material and infection prevention over the last couple decades. Currently there are many options available for dismounted troops to protect them from all types of danger. Below are a few of the currently-fielded systems and what is to come.

E-SAPI/X-SAPI ballistic plates: Armored plates (of a shape and curvature to be placed against the body) that provide protection from explosively-formed projectiles.

Pelvic Protection System: To reduce casualties and minimize damage to vital areas of the body the U.S. Army teamed with other organizations and the industry to develop and rapidly field the Pelvic Protective System. The system is currently composed of two layers: an inner layer (underwear), and outer layer (ballistic protection).

== Armored/mine-resistant and counter-IED vehicles ==
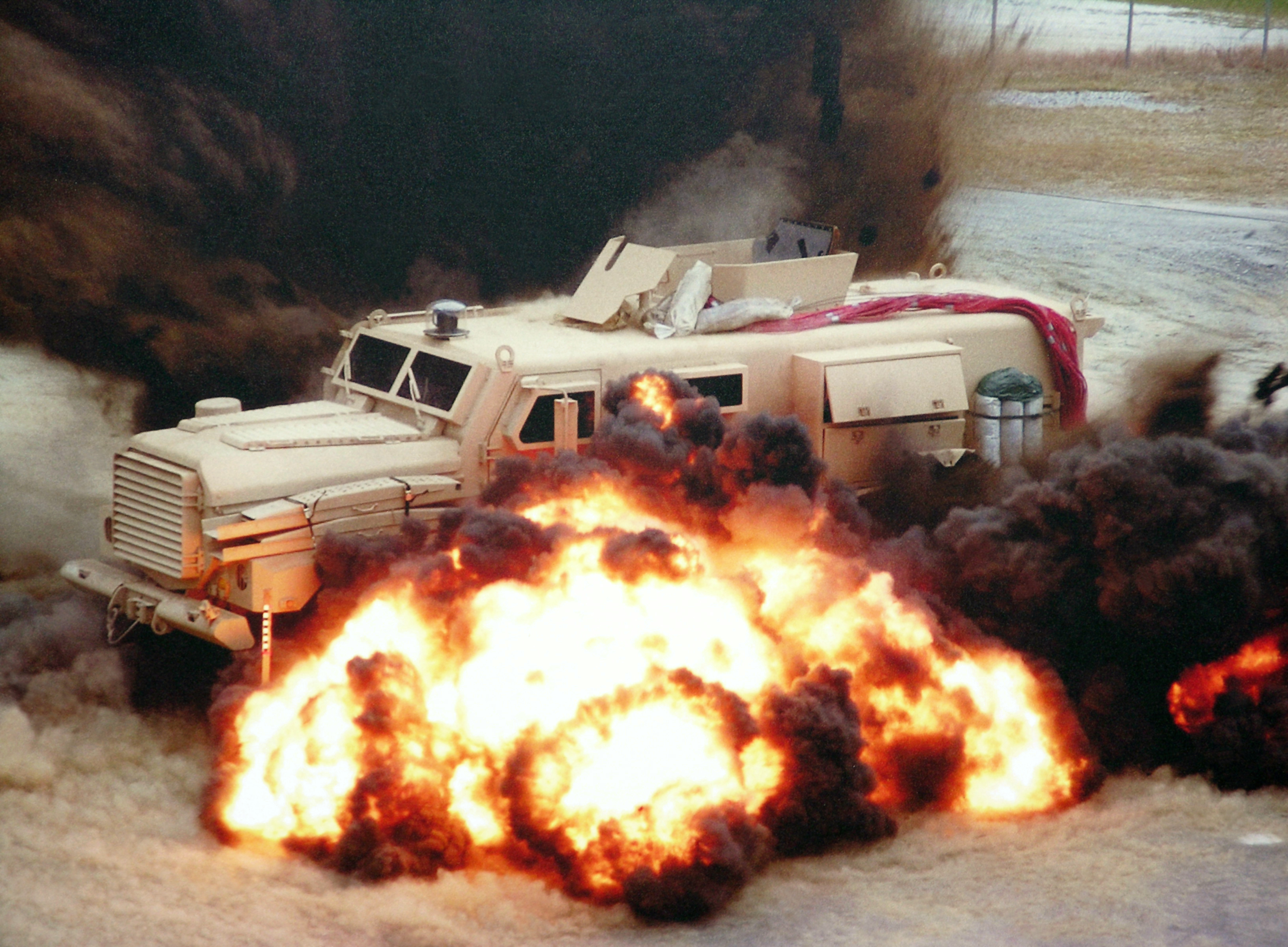
MRAP (Cougar variant) being blast tested

=== Mine Resistant Ambush Protected Vehicles ===
The MRAPV (Mine Resistant Ambush Protected Vehicles) program was prompted by U.S. deaths in Iraq. MRAP vehicles are designed specifically to withstand improvised explosive device (IED) attacks and ambushes.

As recently as 2007, the U.S. military has ordered the production of about 10,000 MRAPs at a cost of over $500,000 each, and planned to order more MRAPs. Currently there are many different variants produced by several different manufacturers. Similar vehicles have been built and are in active service with military, police and private sector security companies worldwide.

The Husky VMMD (Vehicle-Mounted Mine Detection) is a South African configurable counter-IED MRAP designed for route clearance and demining. It is designed to assist in the disposal of land mines and improvised explosive devices.

The Husky was initially deployed in the 1970s. The South African Defense Force used the Husky extensively to clear mines from military convoy routes in Namibia and Angola during the South African Border War.

In the mid-1990s, Husky underwent a two-year foreign comparative test program within the United States Department of Defense that resulted in additional follow-on modifications and testing. In 1997, production systems were delivered under the U.S. Army Interim Vehicle Mounted Mine Detection Program.

Over the next twenty years, the Husky went through a number of iterations and upgrades. U.S. and International military' route clearance units currently employ Husky vehicles as IED detection and clearance vehicles. Husky VMMD

=== Modified construction equipment ===
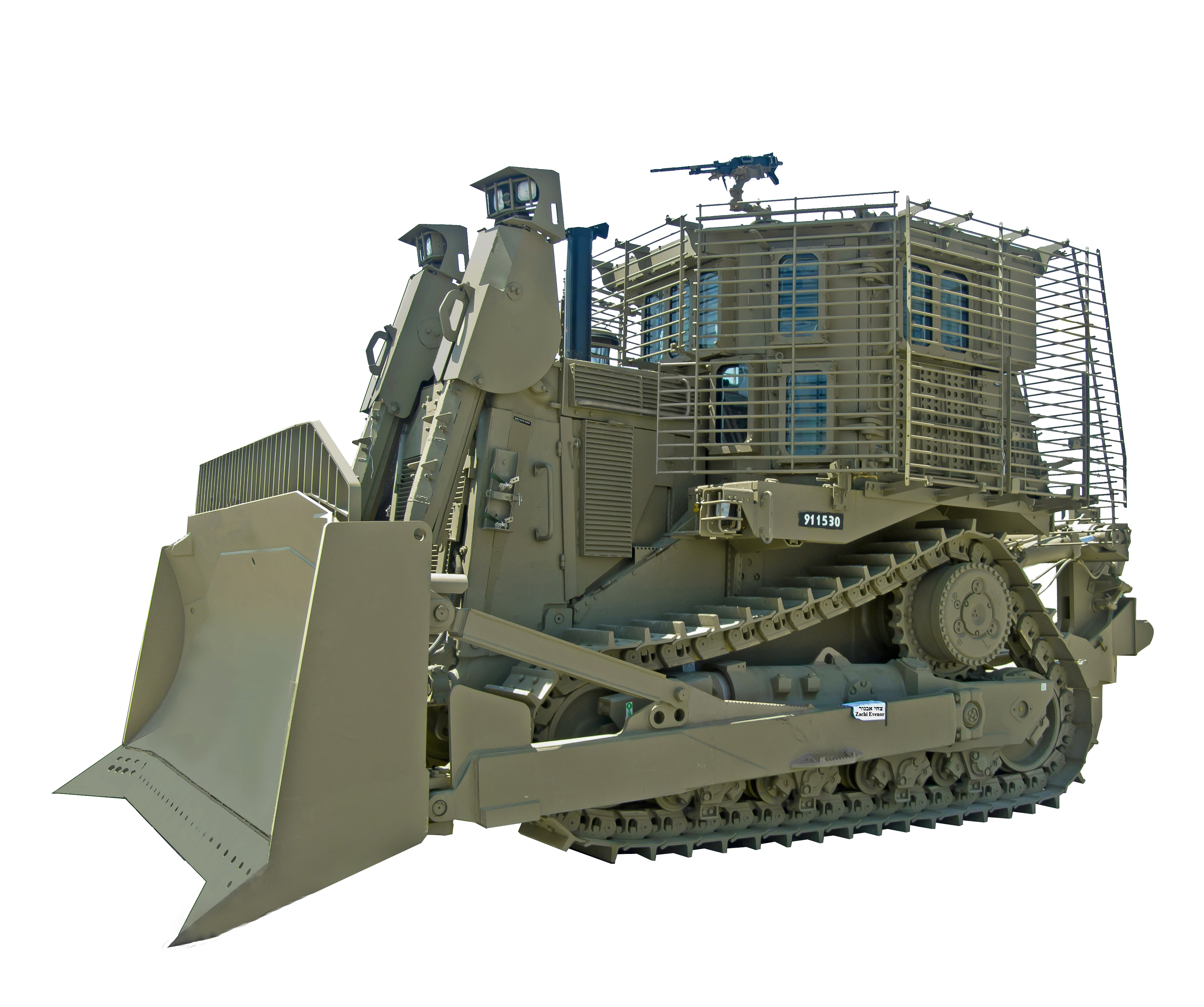
IDF Caterpillar D9 armored bulldozer, which is used by the IDF for clearing IEDs/Mines

The Israel Defense Forces Combat Engineering Corps uses an armored version of the Caterpillar D9, called IDF Caterpillar D9 "Doobi", to clear paths and operational terrain from landmines and a various IEDs. The heavy armor and durable construction of the IDF D9 enable it to withstand very heavy "belly charges" (IEDs weighing more than 100 kg planted underground to hit the hull of an armored fighting vehicle) which are capable of destroying main battle tanks. The IDF also have a remote-controlled version of the D9N (called "Raam HaShachar", "Dawn Thunder" in Hebrew) and the D9T (called "Panda") to clear IEDs in very dangerous environments.

The United States Army uses an armored version of the Caterpillar D7 to clear landmines. A remote version of the D7 exists.

== Electronic countermeasures (jammers, ECM) ==
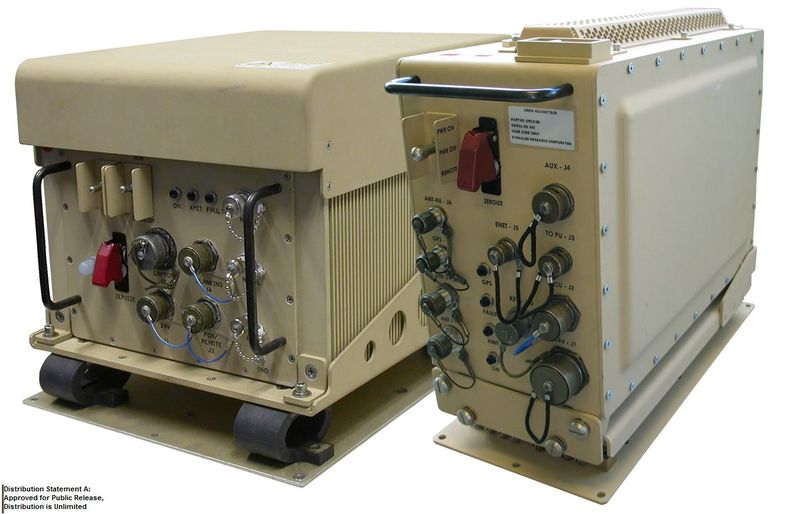
Duke V3 Counter Radio-controlled Electronic Warfare jamming system

Duke Version 3 Vehicle mounted CREW system: Duke V3, manufactured by SRCTec, Inc., is a counter radio-controlled improvised explosive device (RCIED) electronic warfare (CREW) system that was developed to provide U.S. forces critical, life-saving protection against a wide range of threats. It is a field deployable system that was designed to have minimal size, weight and power requirements while providing simple operation and optimal performance in order to provide force protection against radio-controlled IEDs. CREW Duke V3 consists of a primary unit known as the CREW Duke V2 and a secondary unit that features advanced electronic warfare subsystems to counter emerging advanced RCIED technologies. Advanced EW components and techniques are implemented to combat complex threat infrastructures in order to provide a maximum protection radius while minimizing the overall system cost and prime power consumption requirements.

To quote the manufacturer: "The Duke system was selected as one of the U.S. Army's Top 10 Greatest Inventions in both 2005 and 2009".

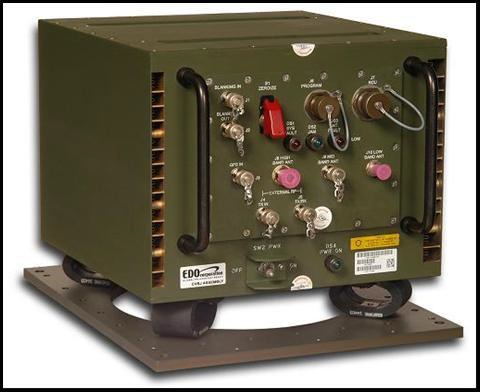
CVRJ CREW Vehicle Receiver Jammer

CVRJ (CREW Vehicle Receiver Jammer) U.S. Marines: The primary purpose of the CVRJ system is to defeat existing Radio Frequency (RF) threats and newly identified Hard-to-Kill RF threats. The CVRJ system accomplishes its primary mission by jamming each threat's transmitted RF signals. The secondary purpose of the CVRJ system is to add the capability to combine multiple internal RF signals and external RF inputs from other systems, and serve as the conduit for transmitting those RF signals while maintaining system interoperability. It accomplishes both missions via 15 waveform programmable RF channels. The system is software controlled to meet specific threats. Indicators on the CVRJ front panel and Remote Control Unit (RCU) allow the operator to observe system health and diagnostic messages. Built-In-Test (BIT) routines run during system initialization and operation that notify the operator of system faults by illuminating indicators referred to as "annunciators" and by displaying text messages on the RCU display. The system is highly automated which reduces operator interaction. The system draws up to 36 amps of vehicle power, weighs approximately 69 lbs, and measures 13″H × 14″W × 19″D.

Vehicle Jammer System STAR V: Protective modular jamming system STAR V 740 is intended for a protection against RCIED. The system either prevents the activation of RCIED or it can significantly reduce the distance for a bomb activation. The system is used to protect the special EOD teams or for a convoy protection. The jamming is performed by random frequency sweeping in a few frequencies sub-bands at the same time. Each sub-band has a possibility to set up to two communication windows for mutual radio communication. The jamming system is equipped with 8 wideband transmitters, 3 low-pass filters, 1 combiner, 6 omni-directional antennas and 8 wide-band digital exciters. The higher level of jamming efficiency is accomplished by using more parallel subsystems and digital technology. The jamming system is intended as a mobile system which is installed in the vehicle. It is equipped with the Omni-directional antennas that are part of the system. The output power of the jammer is up to 740 W. The jamming system is easily controlled and the failures are easily diagnosed. It is controlled on the front panel. The operator can switch on/off particular transmitting systems and subsystems, set up to three jamming sub-bands in each. Dwell time in each sub-band can also be modified. Jammer is equipped with IP, RS 485 and USB interface. System is also equipped with special SW which can be installed on a notebook or a PC. Special remote control box is also included. The system's voltage is from 22 to 30 Volts.

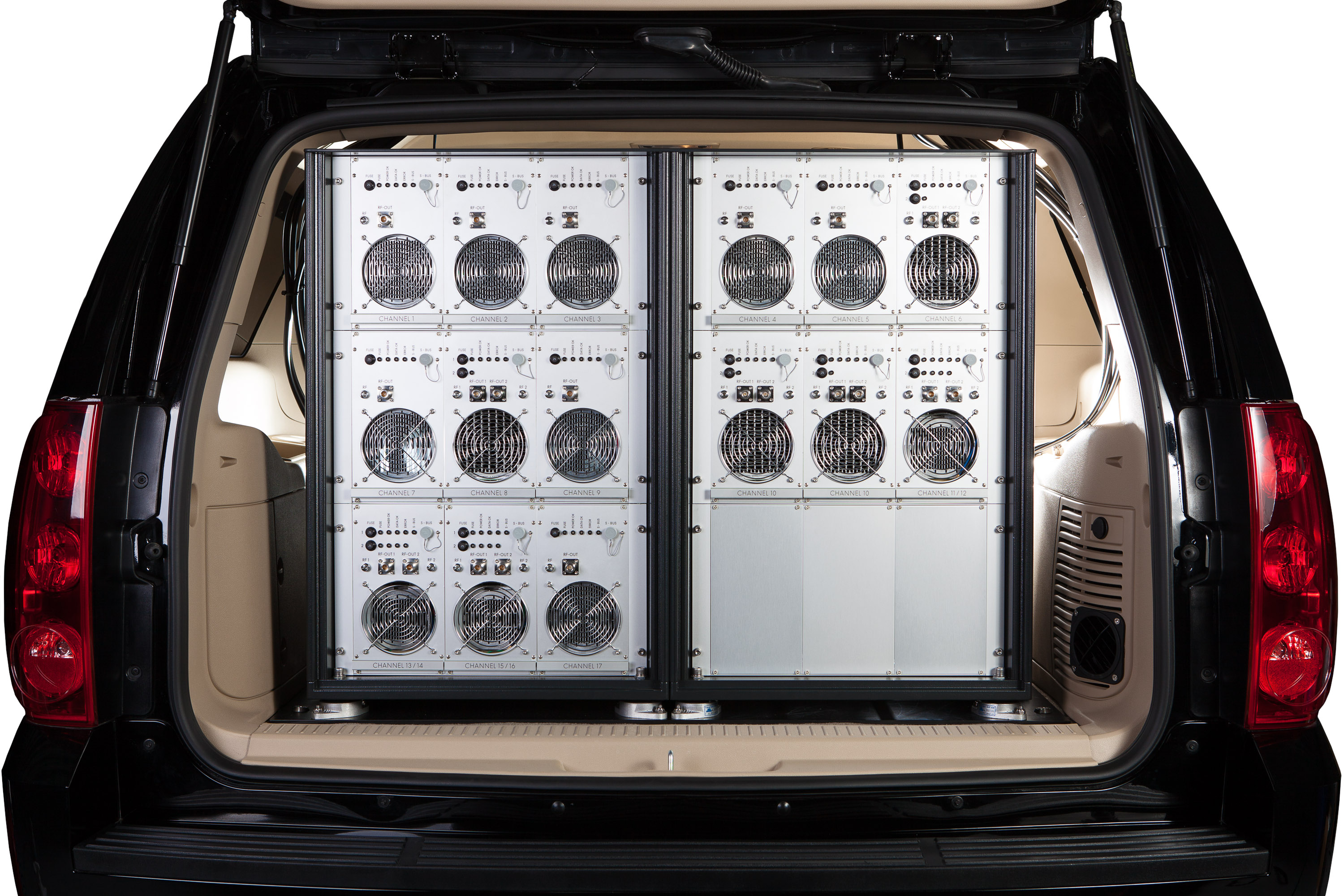
HP 3260 H convoy jammer system installed in a GMC vehicle

Convoy Jammer System HP 3260 H: Modular jamming system intended to protect surrounding vehicles and personnel against RCIED. Designed for maximum frequency coverage and protection range, the system is used for both, civilian and military motorcades. The modularity enables users to scale the system according to operational requirements and the software allows programming of all signal generators independently to ensure utmost configurability and maximising the effectiveness of the jamming signals.

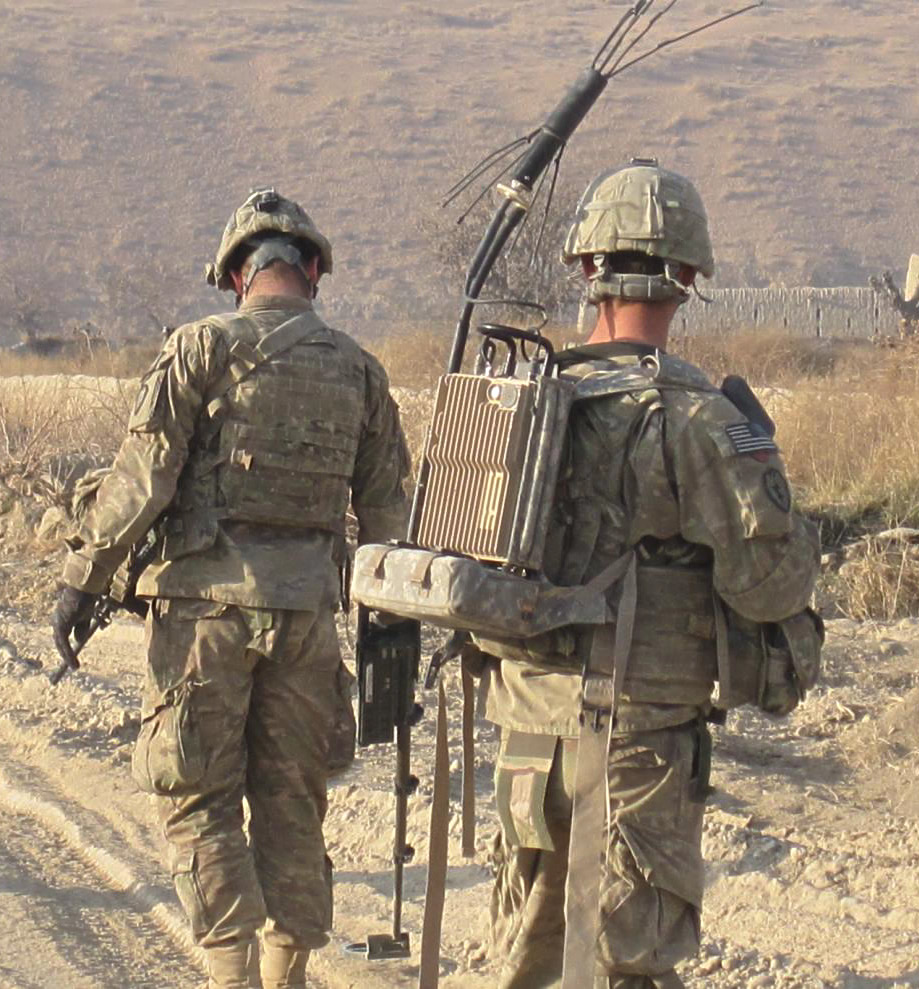
Two soldiers with the 25th Infantry Division operate Thor and Minehound, two counter-IED devices.

Thor III dismounted CREW system: The Thor III system consists of three dismounted man-pack subsystems, one battery charger, and twenty-four batteries (BB-2590/U). Each subsystem contains a R/T (low band, mid band or high band), a Remote Control Unit (RCU), an integration/pack frame, an Rx/Tx Antenna (low band, mid band, or high band), a GPS antenna, cables, and software. Each subsystem is housed in a separate transit case with protective covers. The purpose of the Thor III dismounted system is to provide the user in the field with a wearable Radio-Controlled Improvised Explosive Device (RCIED) jammer that has been designed to counter an array of frequency diverse threats. The system is an expandable, active and reactive, scanning-receiver-based jammer with multiple jamming signal sources that allow it to counter multiple simultaneous threats.

Joint IED Neutralizer (JIN): In 2005, Ionatron attempted to develop an anti IED device that would "zap" IEDs from a distance by using lasers to ionize the air and allow man-made lightning to shoot towards the devices detonating them at a safe distance. By using femtosecond lasers light pulses that last less than a ten-trillionth of a second JIN could carve conductive channels of ionized oxygen in the air. Through these channels, Ionatron's blaster sent man-made lightning bolts.

Thor IED Zappers: The vehicular system is mounted on a remotely controlled weapon station, carrying the laser beam director and high-energy laser and coaxial 12.7 mm machine gun to neutralize improvised explosive devices from a safe, standoff distance.^{Restricted link}

Ultra Wide Band High Powered Electro Magnetics: An UWB-HPEM system typically consists of the following components: a battery-based direct current power supply, an actuation system, a semiconductor-based ultra-wideband pulse generator and an ultra-wideband antenna. Depending on the type of threat, it can either set off a sensor-triggered IEDs in a controlled explosion or prevent it from being remotely detonated by radio or mobile phone. A UWB-HPEM system can be loaded onto a vehicle, creating an electromagnetic protection zone for a convoy, potentially in combination with other systems.

IED Countermeasure Equipment (ICE): In the fall of 2004, the Army Research Laboratory (ARL) at White Sands Missile Range in New Mexico and New Mexico State University's Physical Science Laboratory developed a jamming system that uses low-power radio frequency energy to block the radio signals that detonate enemy IEDs. The IED Countermeasure Equipment is typically mounted on a vehicle and is used to neutralize IEDs when avoiding, disarming, or destroying them is not practical. So far, several thousand ICE systems have been deployed to U.S. military personnel.

=== Other Countermeasures ===
Ground Ordnance Land Disruptor: G.O.L.D. is a user filled, explosively driven Counter-IED system that renders buried IEDs safe through a combination of disruption, component separation and expulsion from the ground allowing the IED to remain biometrically intact.

Rhino: Rhino is a box-shaped heating device attached to a long pole that can be mounted to the front of a vehicle to prematurely detonate any buried IEDs in front of the vehicle.

== Detection Systems ==
A variety of technologies are used to detect landmines, improvised explosive devices (IED) and unexploded ordnance (UXO), including acoustic sensors, animals and biologically-based detection systems (bees, dogs, pigs, rats), chemical sensors, electromagnetic sensors and hyperspectral sensor analysis, generalized radar techniques, ground penetrating radar, lidar and electro-optical sensors (including hyperspectral and millimeter wave), magnetic signatures, nuclear sensors, optical sensors, seismic acoustic sensors, and thermal detection.

Counter-IED Reconnaissance Planes: The U.S. Army's Task Force ODIN-E flies manned reconnaissance aircraft that use an array of full-motion video (FMV), electro-optical (EO), infrared (IR), and synthetic aperture radar (SAR) imagery sensors to find IEDs.

IED Volumetric Detection:

Microwave Based Explosive Caches Detection: Raytheon UK's Soteria vehicle-mounted stand-off system provides high-definition IED detection, confirmation and threat diagnostics from a significant distance. Soteria's optical processing technology has the following capabilities: a high probability of IED detection with a low false positive rate, detection of high, medium, low and zero metal content IEDs, assisted target recognition, and day and night operability.

Non-linear Junction Detector (NLJD): A portable NLJD allows the operator to search voids and areas where they are unable to gain physical or visual access, in order to detect electronic components and determine if the area is free from IEDs.

Laser IED Detection: Scientists are learning to adapt lasers to detect, or defeat, IEDs.

Mine detectors: A portable, hand-held or worn device to detect buried IEDs. There are many different models from several different companies currently in use worldwide by U.S. and coalition forces. These are not your run of the mill metal detectors that you can buy at your local store, they are highly sophisticated, ultra sensitive, programmable devices.

== Unmanned Systems intended for Counter-IED ==
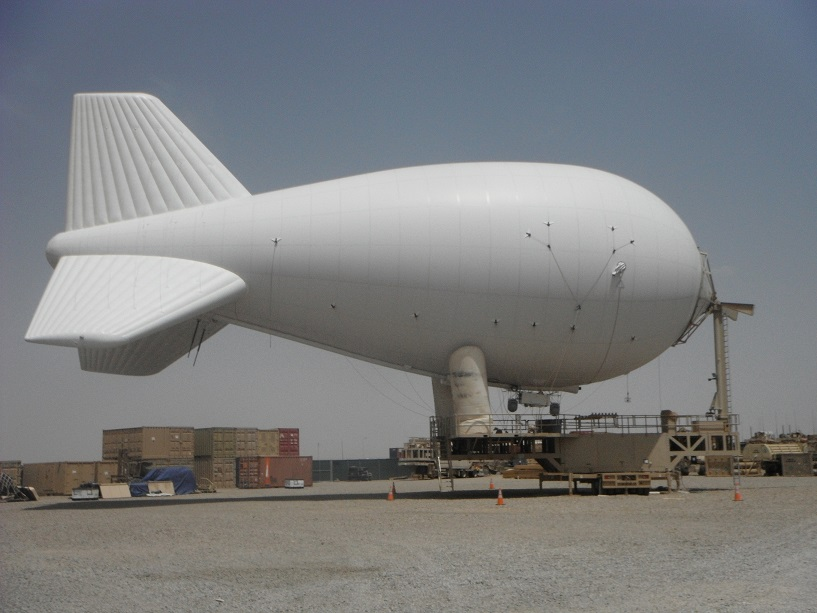
Current version of PTDS, a widely used Aerostat in combat operations

=== Aerostats ===
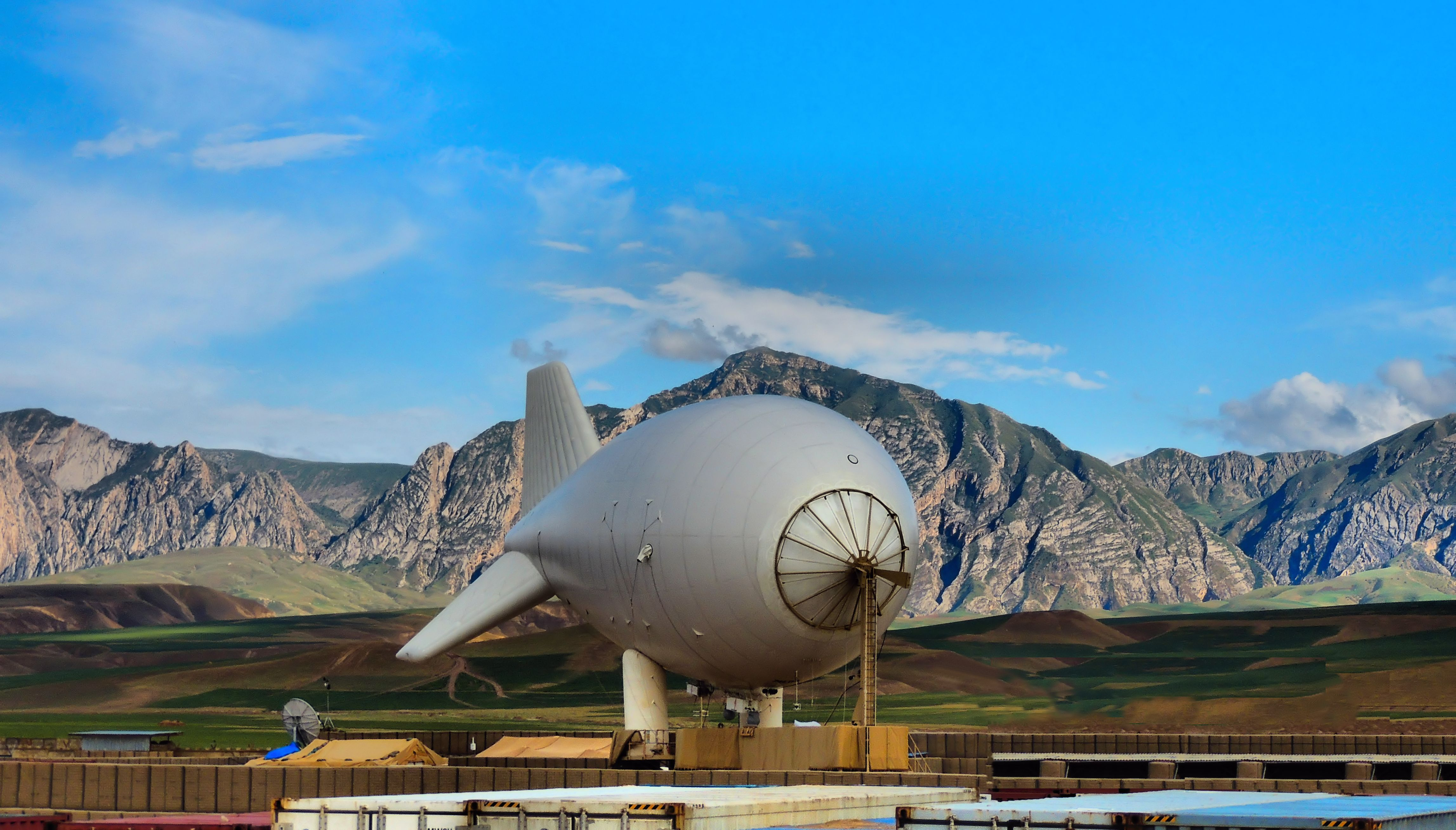
Tethered Aerostat over Afghanistan

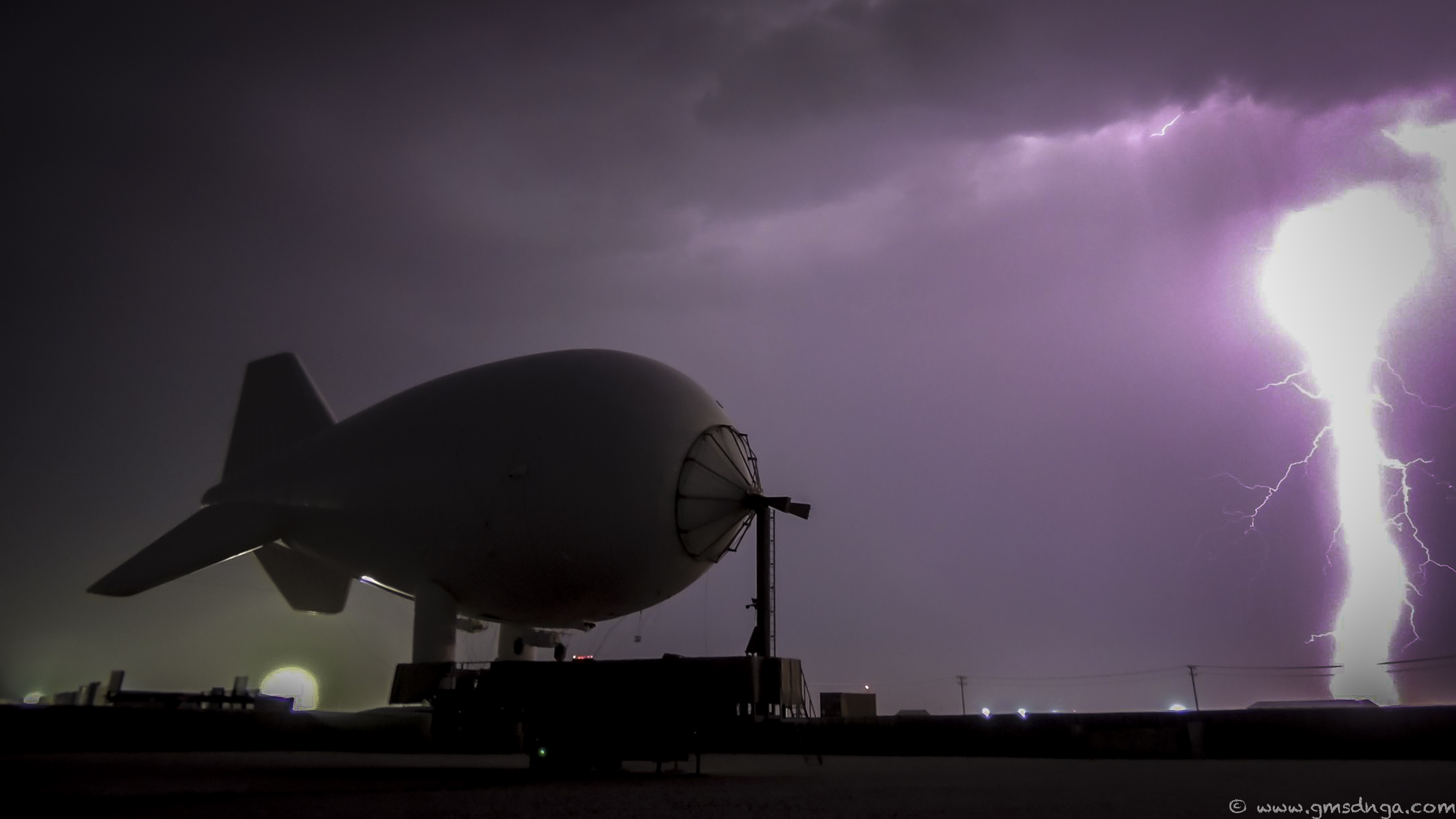
Lightning Strike at MEZ

Aerostats are balloons equipped with stabilized electro optical, infrared, and radar sensors which are manned 24 hours a day. The Persistent Threat Detection System (PTDS) was the largest and most capable Aerostat ever used in combat. The largest non-combat is the TARS aerostat. First used in 2004 (Camp Slayer, Iraq). It can sit for weeks, thousands of feet above a base, forward operating base or combat outpost. Known as the "unblinking eye", Aerostats provide real-time High Definition imagery of the surrounding area, day or night, and are strategically placed for surveillance purposes. The commands controlling it can be US or NATO forces that control its use and missions. They enhance situational awareness and improve force protection. Aerostats can be used to reconnoiter routes before friendly forces travel them and to provide over watch for dismounted troops or convoys. They can also serve as a communications and Full Motion Video (FMV) relay platform to extend the range and disseminate situational awareness. They are linked with several ground-based sensors, including acoustic sensors that detect and locate weapon fire or blasts.

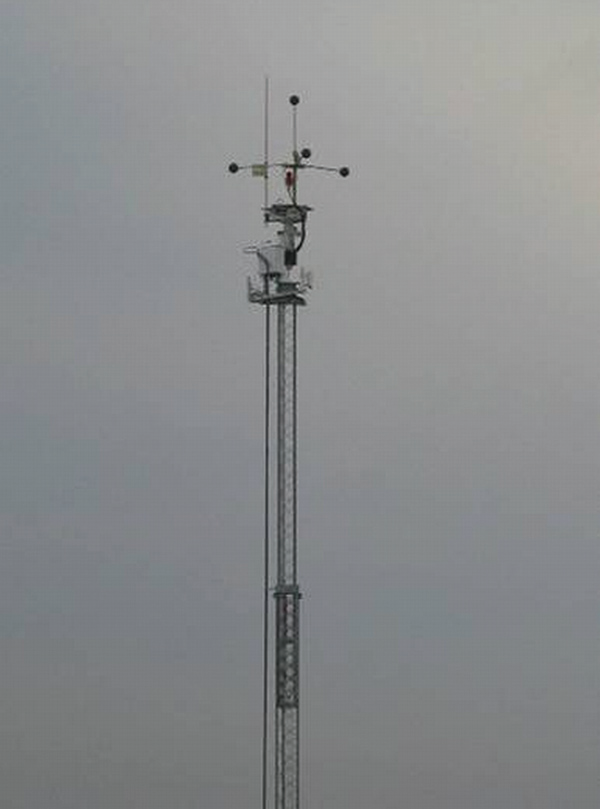
MASINT-UTAMS tower

=== Persistent Threat Detection System (PTDS) ===
The Persistent Threat Detection System (PTDS) is a large helium-filled lighter than air system designed by Lockheed Martin to provide soldiers long range intelligence, surveillance, reconnaissance and communication assistance.

Since the American Civil War, when Union Soldiers utilized hot air balloons to serve as a surveillance platform, airship technology has been a part of the Army's inventory. As U.S. forces began a troop surge in Afghanistan while maintaining security in Iraq, the need to provide soldiers with a persistent view of the battlefield was critical.

In 2003, Lockheed Martin engineers began updating existing naval aerostats with durable materials capable of achieving lift while carrying larger payloads of sensors, cameras and audio equipment. New tethers—lined with a mix of copper wires and fiber-optic cables—transmitted data to a ground control station, which then disseminated near real-time information of hostile activity to operational forces.

The aerostats are reconnaissance tool, gathering intelligence from 20 miles in every direction, 24 hours a day, for weeks on end. In Iraq and Afghanistan, there was a special need for enhanced surveillance, especially in the attempt to counter improvised explosive devices. In late 2013, PTDS was utilized by Customs Border Patrol in Texas to reduce the criminal activities crossing the Rio Grande. Over 700 Field engineers from Lockheed Martin were scattered across both countries with a small 5 man specialist team known as the 'Tiger Team' used for site setups, repair and more.

The Army Research Laboratory developed and then mounted PTDS with an acoustic-sensor array, known as the Unattended Transient Acoustic MASINT Sensor (UTAMS). The technology detects, locates, and cues a collocated imager to transient sounds, such as enemy mortar, gunfire, rocket launches, and IED attacks, and calculates the ground location of the threat source. Adding this airborne detection – localization – cueing capability provides accurate intelligence to PTDS. PTDS is compatible with other technology developed by the Army Research Laboratory, such as Serenity Payload and FireFly. Although the main equipment used was the L-3 Communications MX-20 analog and later, digital cameras. The same platform utilized a high power laser that could be used for spotting and exposing insurgent locations in the dark.

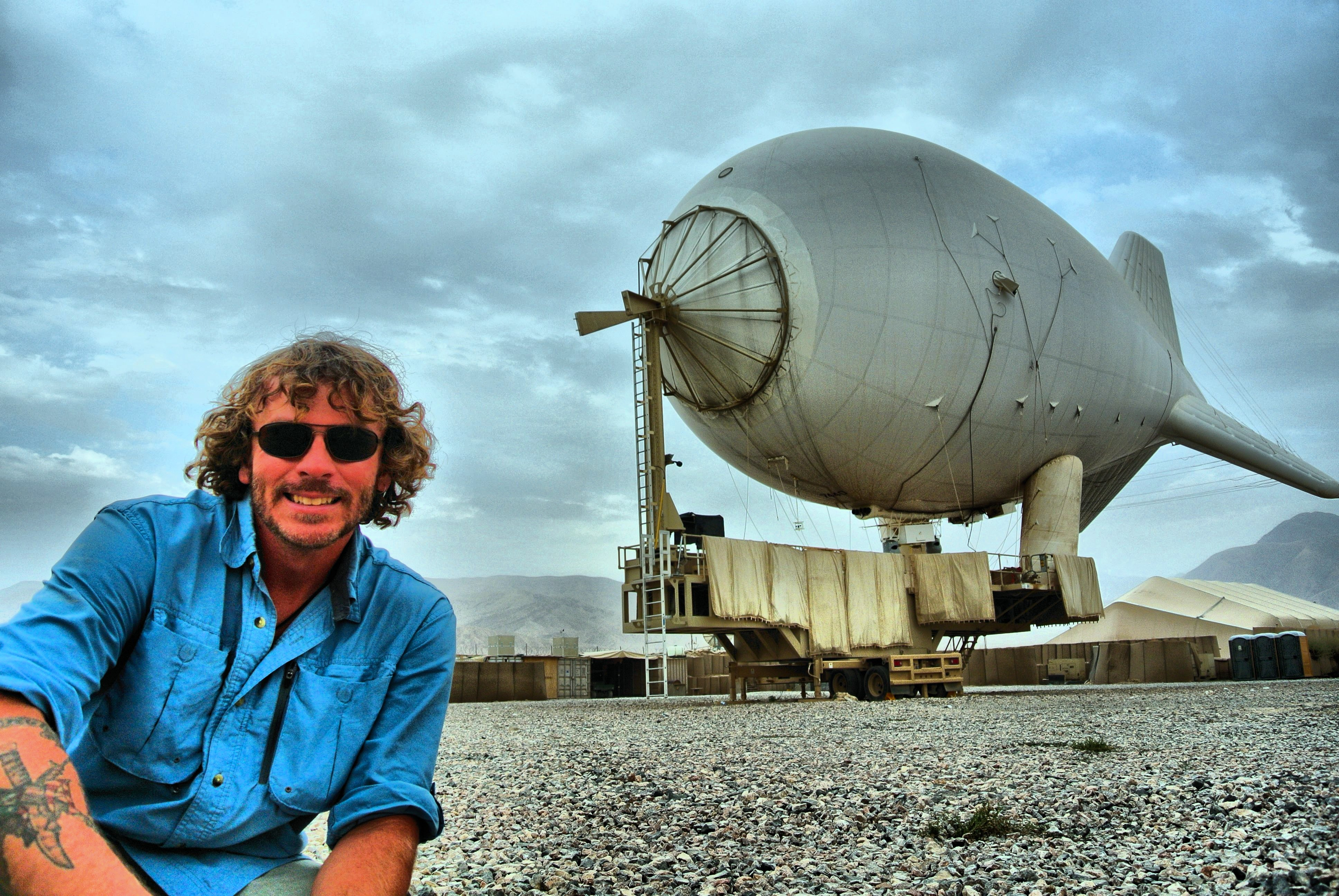
"Fletch" Lockheed Martin's Field Engineers

The first PTDS was deployed by the US Army in 2004 and 37 PTDS units were acquired by 2010. Lockheed Martin delivered the final PTDS to the US Army in May 2012, bringing the total number of systems procured by the US Army to 66. Later systems were developed and used in the return to Iraq in 2015. The contract was eventually lost to another bidder and the program declined in useful status up to the complete removal from Afghanistan and Iraqi draw down.

The airship has been one of the Army's major weapons since 2004 and was recognized by the Department of Army Engineers and Scientists as the Army's greatest invention in 2005.

=== Unmanned Ground Vehicles (UGV) ===
A UGV is a vehicle kit system that advances perception, localization and motion planning to protect from IED threats and increase performance in autonomous missions. They typically are adaptable to any tactical wheeled vehicle for the purpose of supervised autonomous navigation in either a lead or follow role. UGVs are multi-sensor systems which use registration techniques to provide accurate positioning estimates without needing to rely on continuous tracking through a lead vehicle or GPS signals. When equipped with a UGV, each vehicle is capable of navigation to the objective independently.

== Improvised Explosive Device Countermeasure Equipment ==
The Improvised Explosive Device Countermeasure Equipment (ICE) is a vehicle-mounted electronics-based jamming system that uses low-power radio frequency energy to thwart enemy improvised explosive devices (IEDs). The radio frequency energy it emits blocks the signals broadcast by radio-controlled detonators, such as cell phones and cordless telephones, that would otherwise trigger the hidden IED to explode. ICE was developed by the Army Research Laboratory (ARL) at White Sands Missile Range and the Physical Science Laboratory (PSL) at New Mexico State University in 2004 to counter the rising IED threat in Iraq. Due to the urgent demand for counter-IED equipment, ICE was designed and built within three weeks and was provided to troops in less than six months after the project started.

ICE was designed to be adaptable to future adjustments in order to keep up with changing IED technology. In addition, it was simple enough for soldiers to repair it at the unit level. Researchers later developed a portable version of ICE called Dismounted IED Countermeasures Equipment (DICE), which allowed soldiers to carry the jamming system in a backpack.

ICE proved to be largely successful against the IED threat and several thousand ICE systems were deployed to U.S. military personnel. In 2005, it was recognized as one of the U.S. Army’s "Top Ten Greatest Inventions of 2004," and the award was shared between those who spearheaded the project, ARL’s Shane Cunico, PSL’s Sam Mares, and Maj. Raymond Pickering.
