= Rhino Runner =

RhinoRUNNER
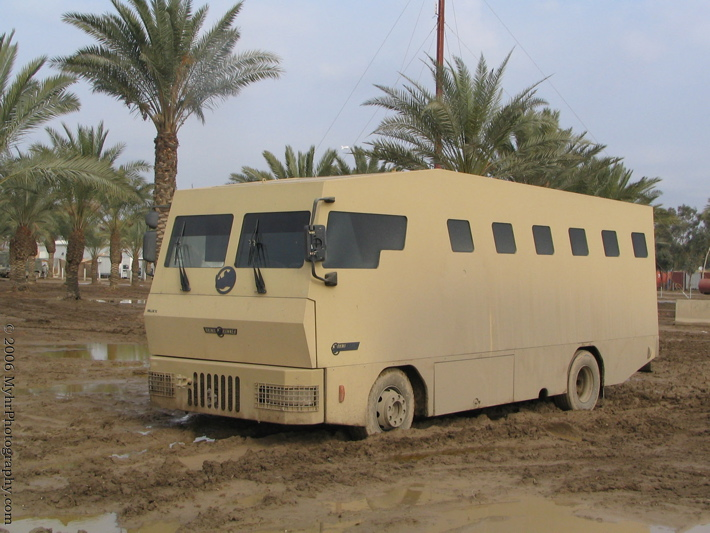

Overview
- Manufacturer: Armour Group, Inc.
- Production: 2004-present

Body and chassis
- Class: Armored Car
- Body style: Bus

Powertrain
- Engine: 6-cylinder turbo diesel 5.88 liters @240 hp

Dimensions
- Length: unknown
- Width: unknown
- Height: unknown
- Curb weight: 13 short tons

The Rhino Runner is a type of armored bus used extensively in Iraq, especially on the infamous Route Irish between Baghdad International Airport and The Green Zone. It is a customized vehicle created by Labock Technologies, which was purchased in 2008 by another company called Advanced Blast Protection. In 2010 Advanced Blast Protection was purchased by Armour Group, Inc. The Rhino Runner is made in various sizes with different purposes. Duties include normal transport of civilian contractors and military personnel, and usage by VIPs, including transport of prisoners involved in the Iraqi Special Tribunal.

== Known specifications ==
- Custom-built from chassis up.
- Side and back doors, emergency exit hatch on roof.
- Dual A/C system.
- 360-degree protection includes floor, exhaust system protected by armored grille, and glass.
- 12 discreet gun ports
- 6-cylinder turbo diesel 5.88 liters 240 hp.
- NIJ Level IV materials (composite armor and bullet-resistant glass) tested against .30 caliber AP (U.S. APM2) 166 grain 2850 feet per second.
- Instead of adapting armoring for an existing vehicle, Labock uses the most appropriate chassis and motors, and custom builds vehicles with protection against AP (armor-piercing) bullets and significant bomb blast protection.
- The Rhino Runner is fully protected (sides, front, back, roof, floor, and even glass) against up to Type IV (NIJ standard) including NATO calibers.
- Special composite bulletproof armor, which is so light that it floats in water, and ONEWAY® Return Fire Glass that prevents bullets from penetrating, but enables someone to shoot through the glass from inside the vehicle.
- Available in a range of seating capacities (17, 24 and 36 people) and configurations for purposes such as prisoner transport, ambulance, SWAT, command and control, and they can be made to order.
- Apart from the 360-degree ballistic protection, the vehicles have a side and back door and an emergency exit on the roof and run flat tires for when changing a tire is not a viable option.

== Usage ==
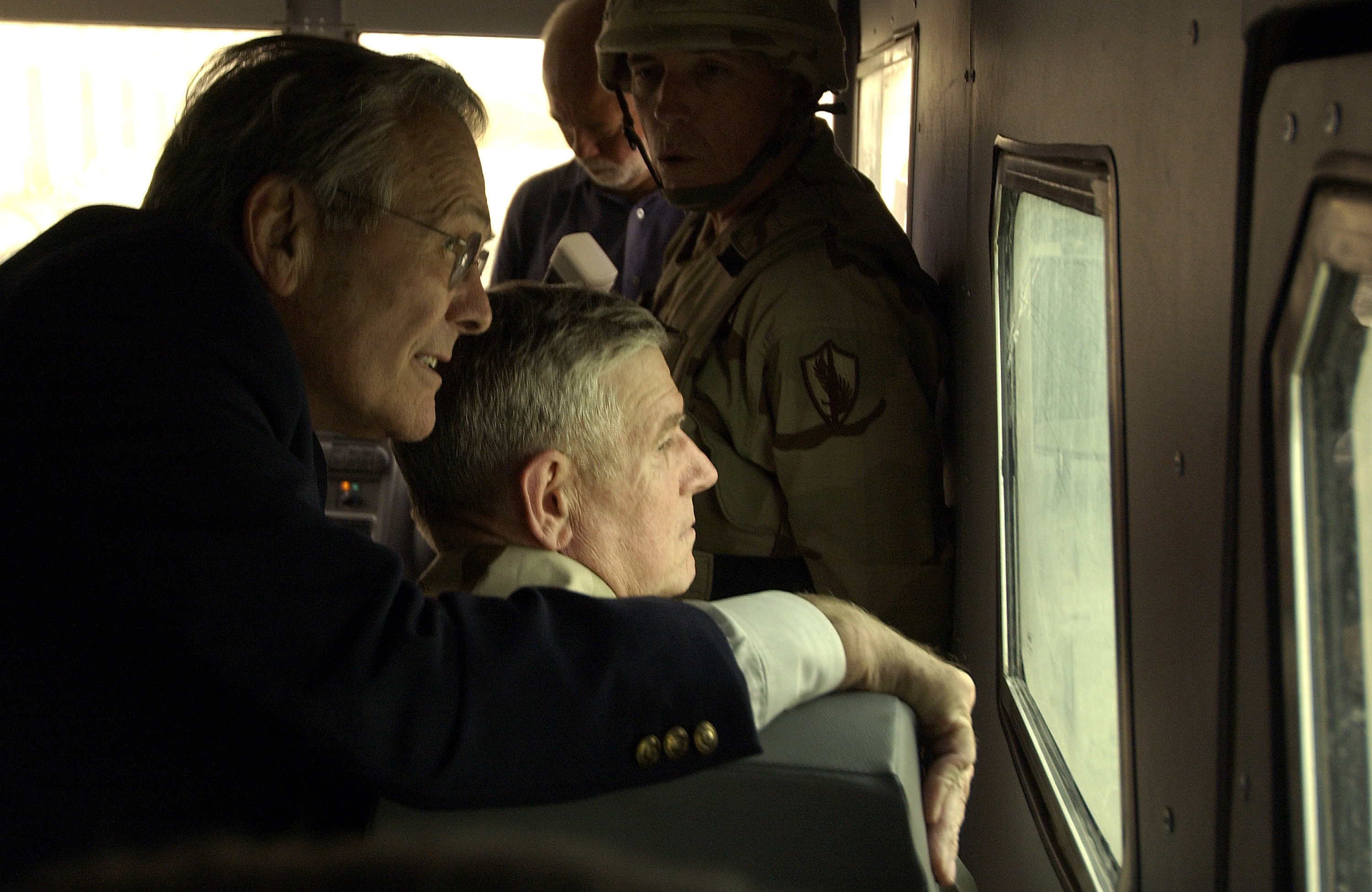
U.S. Secretary of Defense Donald Rumsfeld in a Rhino Runner

The Rhino Runner is mostly used for transportation of civilians and the press between the Baghdad International Airport and the Green Zone. It is also used to transport soldiers from one base to another.

VIPs have been known to use the Rhinos, including U.S. Secretary of Defense Donald Rumsfeld and General Richard Myers.

An unpublicized usage of the buses is to transport VIP prisoners, such as the now-deceased Saddam Hussein, between their confinements and the tribunal.
