= Rhino Passive Infrared Defeat System =

The Rhino Passive Infrared Defeat System (also known simply as Rhino) was an early detonation Counter-IED system. It was mounted to the front of a vehicle and used heat to prematurely detonate any hidden improvised explosive devices (IEDs) while the vehicle was at a safe distance away from the blast. It was developed by the Joint Improvised-Threat Defeat Organization (JIEDDO) in 2006 during the war in Iraq to counter the rise of IED-related deaths.

== Inspiration ==
During the Iraq War, the rising number of troops killed and wounded by underbelly IEDs buried by insurgents in the middle of the road prompted the U.S. military to funnel billions of dollars into the development of several countermeasures to either detect the explosive or minimize the damage. However, the frequent delays in producing and delivering these countermeasures to Iraq lead to shortages in effective IED-defeating technology. As a result, several soldiers on the battlefield ended up improvising their own solutions that took advantage of how the passive infrared sensors on the IEDs reacted to heat signatures. One unnamed soldier proposed mounting a large hair dryer to the front of the vehicle to blow hot air on the road to prematurely set off any hidden IEDs and clear the path. Another soldier supposedly purchased a toaster at a bazaar, plugged the appliance into his Humvee, and attached it to the end of a long pole that was welded to the front of the vehicle. These and other similar ideas led JIEDDO to develop Rhino in 2006, one of their earliest innovations.

The initial design consisted of a glow plug that was placed inside a metal ammunition can, which was then attached to a 10 ft long metal pole with the other end mounted onto the front of a vehicle. The glow plug acted as a heat decoy, which triggered any nearby IED’s infrared sensor prematurely and fired the copper explosively formed penetrator (EFP) slug at the Rhino instead of the vehicle behind it. The countermeasure proved to be a success at the time as U.S. forces found that the Rhino could not only take the impact of an EFP but also, in rare cases, continue working afterwards.

== Changes ==
Despite the favorable outcome of the Rhino’s initial run, insurgents soon began making modifications to the IEDs to account for this countermeasure. Within six weeks, the aim of the EFP was adjusted so that the slug was fired 10 feet back from the Rhino to hit the vehicle. In response, JIEDDO and researchers at the Army Research Laboratory in Adelphi, Maryland designed and developed the Rhino II, which came with a telescoping pole whose length could be adjusted to change the position of the heat decoy. More than 16,000 Rhino II devices were deployed to the U.S. Army and Marines in Iraq by the end of 2008, costing around $1,800 each to produce. Before long, the Rhino II was featured on almost every U.S. vehicle in Iraq. However, by 2010, newer IEDs began to use high-powered radio waves from coalition jammers instead of heat signatures to set off the EFP as a countermeasure against Rhino II. As of June 2018, more than 34,000 Rhino gadgets have been deployed to U.S. troops overseas.
