= United States Army Research Laboratory =

Research facility of the United States Army

Coordinates: 39.0296°N 76.9647°W

DEVCOM Army Research Laboratory
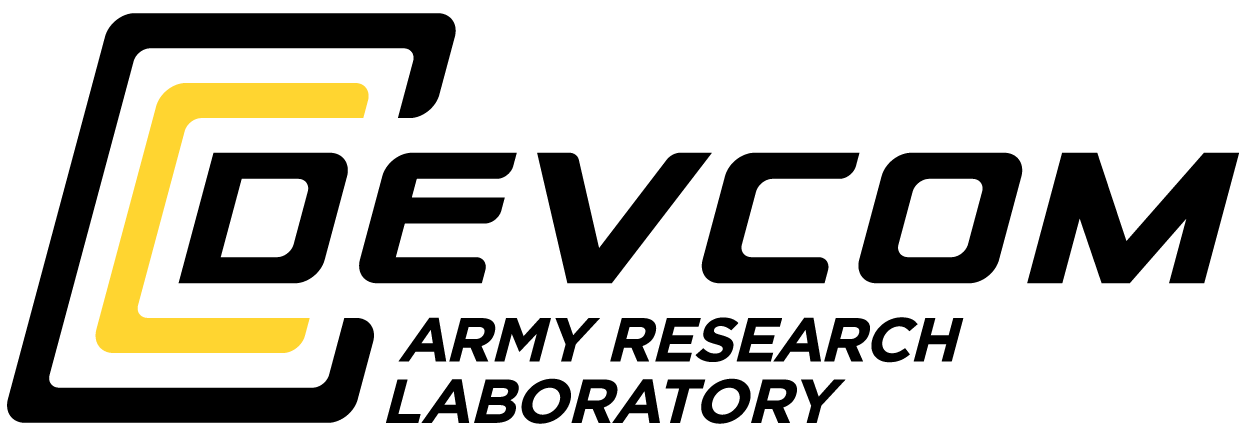
- DEVCOM Army Research Laboratory – Logo
- Active: October 1992–present
- Country: United States
- Branch: U.S. Army
- Type: Research and development
- Part of: U.S. Army Combat Capabilities Development Command
- Garrison/HQ: Adelphi, Maryland
- Website: arl.devcom.army.mil/

Commanders
- Director: Kimberly Ploskonka (Acting)

The U.S. Army Combat Capabilities Development Command Army Research Laboratory (DEVCOM ARL) is the sole fundamental research laboratory of the United States Army. DEVCOM ARL is a component unit of the U.S. Army Combat Capabilities Development Command (DEVCOM).

Known simply as the U.S. Army Research Laboratory at its inception, it was established in 1992 to consolidate multiple Army research elements and form a centralized laboratory for scientific research, experimentation, and analysis. Most of the laboratory was constituted by the seven laboratories that comprised the U.S. Army Laboratory Command (LABCOM): the Atmospheric Sciences Laboratory (ASL), the Ballistic Research Laboratory (BRL), the Electronics Technology and Devices Laboratory (ETDL), the Harry Diamond Laboratories (HDL), the Human Engineering Laboratory (HEL), the Materials Technology Laboratory (MTL), and the Vulnerability Assessment Laboratory (VAL). In 1998, the Army Research Office (ARO) was incorporated into the laboratory.

== Organization ==
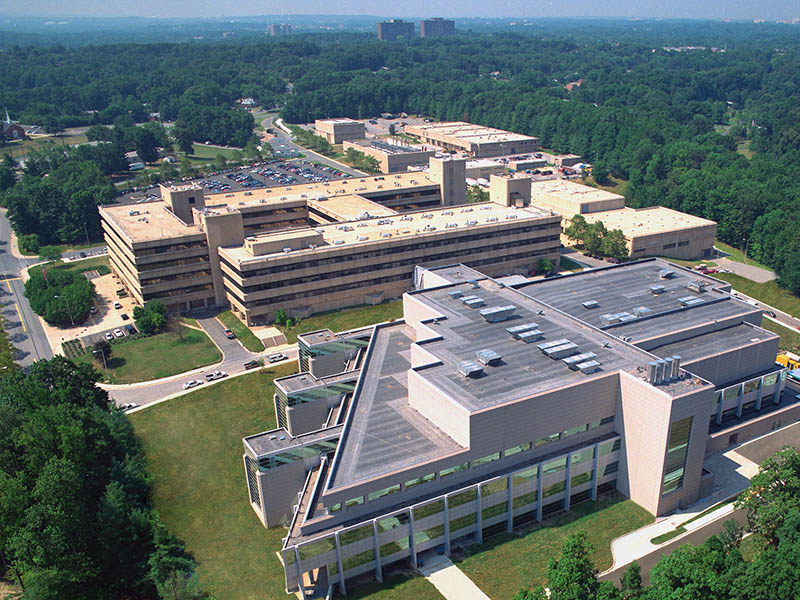
Aerial view of DEVCOM ARL headquarters.

DEVCOM ARL is headquartered at the Adelphi Laboratory Center in Adelphi, Maryland. The laboratory operates additional facilities in several locations around the country, most notably at Aberdeen Proving Ground in Maryland, Research Triangle Park in North Carolina, and White Sands Missile Range in New Mexico.

DEVCOM ARL conducts fundamental scientific research through both intramural and extramural means. The laboratory's in-house research is performed by its Army Research Directorate, which helms the laboratory's flagship research efforts. The Army Research Office (ARO), which operates as the U.S. Army's extramural basic research arm, administers funding for Army-relevant research to universities and businesses across the United States as part of DEVCOM ARL.

=== Regional sites ===
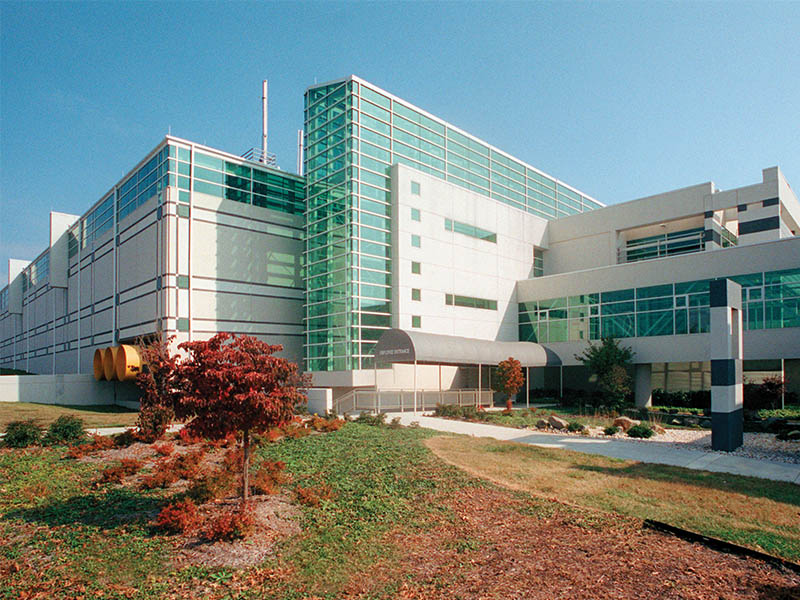
DEVCOM ARL's Rodman Materials Research Laboratory at Aberdeen Proving Ground, Maryland, was named in honor of the commander of Watertown Arsenal, Major Thomas J. Rodman.

DEVCOM ARL manages five regional sites to facilitate research and business partnerships with industry and universities in the surrounding area. ARL West, located in California, specializes in human-information interaction, cybersecurity, embedded processing, and intelligent systems. ARL Central, located in Illinois, specializes in high performance computing, impact physics, machine learning and data analytics, materials and manufacturing, power and energy, propulsion science, and quantum science. ARL South, located in Texas, specializes in artificial intelligence, energy and power, cybersecurity, materials and manufacturing, and biology. ARL Northeast, located in Massachusetts, specializes in materials and manufacturing, artificial intelligence and intelligent systems, and cybersecurity. ARL Mid-Atlantic, located in Maryland, specializes in high-performance computing, autonomous systems, human-agent teaming, cybersecurity, materials and manufacturing, power and energy, extreme materials, and quantum systems.

=== University Affiliated Research Centers ===
DEVCOM ARL manages two University Affiliated Research Centers (UARCs) for the U.S. Army. The Institute of Collaborative Biotechnologies, a UARC led by the University of California, Santa Barbara, focuses on technological innovations in systems biology, synthetic biology, bio-enabled materials, and cognitive neuroscience. The Institute for Soldier Nanotechnologies, a UARC led by the Massachusetts Institute of Technology, focuses on the advancement of nanotechnology to create new materials, devices, processes, and systems to improve Army capabilities.

=== Technology and Research Alliances ===
DEVCOM ARL collaborates with private industry and academia through Collaborative Technology Alliances (CTAs) and Collaborative Research Alliances (CRAs). CTAs represent partnerships that focus on the rapid transition of new innovations and technologies found in academia to the U.S. manufacturing base through cooperation with private industry. CRAs represent partnerships that seek to further develop innovative science and technology in academia that pertains to Army interests. Globally, DEVCOM ARL engaged in International Technology Alliances (ITAs) which facilitate collaborations for research and development with foreign government entities alongside academia and private industry.

== History ==
=== Background (1962–1985) ===
The U.S. Army elements that merged to form the U.S. Army Research Laboratory (ARL) trace their roots back to the research laboratories established under the U.S. Army Signal Corps and the U.S. Army Ordnance Corps. These laboratories provided research and development capabilities to the U.S. Army's technical services that extended beyond traditional electronics and weapons research, covering a wide range of scientific disciplines, to keep pace with the speed of technological development after the Second World War.

In 1962, the authority over the research laboratories transferred to the newly created U.S. Army Materiel Command (AMC) as part of a major Army reorganization. During this transition, AMC combined the Watertown Arsenal Laboratories and the Ordnance Materials Research Office to form the Army Materials Research Agency. The facilities associated with the Ordnance Corps—the Ballistic Research Laboratory, the Human Engineering Laboratory, the Diamond Ordnance Fuze Laboratories, and the Army Materials Research Agency—reported directly to AMC headquarters. On the other hand, the facilities associated with the Signal Corps—the Atmospheric Sciences Laboratory, the Electronic Components Laboratory, and the Signal Missile Support Agency—reported to a major subordinate command in AMC called the Electronics Command (ECOM).

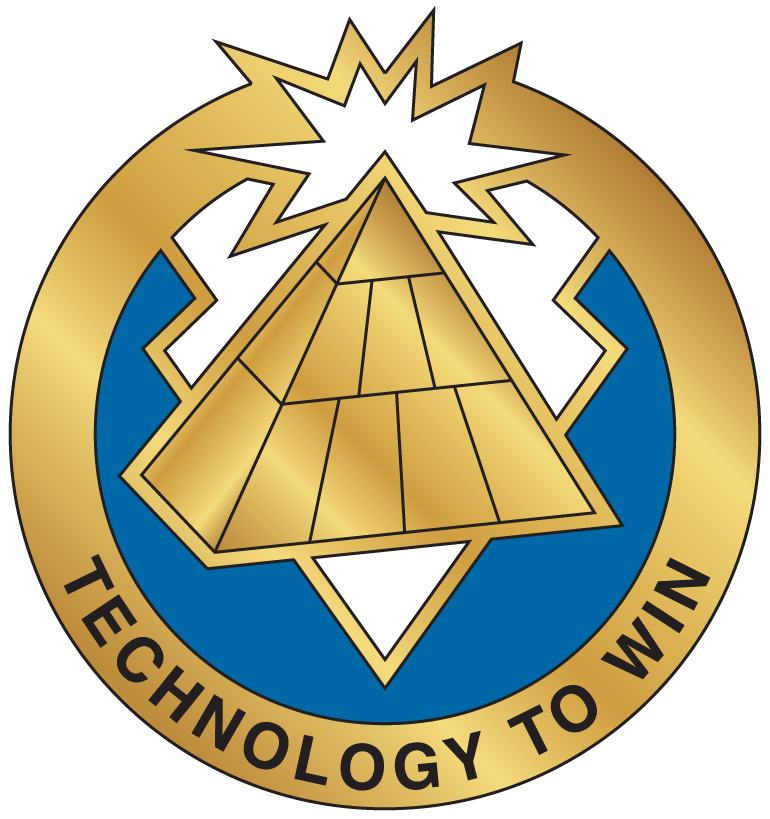
The distinctive unit insignia of LABCOM, and later ARL in its early years.

Over the next two decades, AMC repeatedly reorganized the laboratories and assigned them under different major subordinate commands based on the conclusions of various committee reviews. During this time period, the command itself underwent a name change from AMC to the Materiel Development and Readiness Command (DARCOM) in 1976 and then back to AMC in 1984. In 1985, AMC officially activated the U.S. Army Laboratory Command (LABCOM) under the direction of Commanding General Richard H. Thompson to assemble all the laboratories under a single major subordinate command. LABCOM contained the Atmospheric Sciences Laboratory, the Ballistic Research Laboratory, the Electronics Technology and Devices Laboratory, the Harry Diamond Laboratories, the Human Engineering Laboratory, the Materiel and Mechanics Research Center (renamed the Materials Technology Laboratory during the transition), the Office of Missile Electronic Warfare (renamed the Vulnerability Assessment Laboratory during the transition), and the Army Research Office. AMC tasked LABCOM with advancing basic and applied research, facilitating technology transfer, and providing independent technical advice for the U.S. Army. While management over the laboratories was centralized under a single command, the research facilities were not physically relocated and remained dispersed across the country.

=== Formation of ARL (1988–1992) ===
In December 1988, the Base Realignment and Closure (BRAC) identified the Materials Technology Laboratory (MTL) in Watertown, Massachusetts, for closure due to its outdated facilities. In opposition to MTL's planned closure, LABCOM explored alternative solutions that would allow the laboratory and its capabilities to remain intact in some form. In 1989, LABCOM introduced a proposal to establish a single physical entity that would consolidate all of its laboratories, including MTL, in one location.

Around the same time, President George H. W. Bush directed Secretary of Defense Dick Cheney to develop a plan to fully implement the recommendations made by the Packard Commission. As a result of this directive, the U.S. Army chartered the LAB-21 Study to evaluate the future of Army in-house research, development, and engineering activities. Conducted from November 1989 to February 1990, the LAB-21 Study made recommendations that aligned with LABCOM's proposal for a single, centralized flagship laboratory. A second study known as the Laboratory Consolidation Study took place in June 1990 and endorsed the Army's plan to consolidate the laboratories under LABCOM. However, the proposal was modified to establish the centralized laboratory at two major sites—Adelphi, Maryland and Aberdeen Proving Ground, Maryland—accompanied by elements at White Sands Missile Range, New Mexico and at NASA facilities in Hampton, Virginia, and Cleveland, Ohio.

In April 1991, the U.S. Department of Defense (DoD) submitted the recommendations from the LAB-21 Study for the 1991 BRAC. The laboratory consolidation plan was subsequently endorsed by the BRAC and approved by President Bush. Although the proposed centralized laboratory was originally referred to as the Combat Materiel Research Laboratory in the LAB-21 Study, the name was ultimately changed to the Army Research Laboratory. The Army also decided to have a civilian director occupy the top management position with a general officer as deputy, as opposed to the original plan of having a major general serve as a military commander alongside a civilian technical director.

The U.S. Army discontinued LABCOM and provisionally established the U.S. Army Research Laboratory on July 23, 1992. The seven LABCOM laboratories were consolidated to form ARL's ten technical directorates. Other Army elements that ARL absorbed included the Low Observable Technology and Application (LOTA) Office, the Survivability Management Office (SMO), a portion of the Signatures, Sensors, and Signal Processing Technology Organization (S^{3}TO), the Advanced Systems Concepts Office (ASCO), the Army Institute for Research in Management Information Communications and Computer Sciences (AIRMICS), a portion of the Systems Research Laboratory (SRL), a portion of the Chemical Research, Development, and Engineering Center (CRDEC), a portion of the Army Air Mobility Research and Development Laboratory (AMRDL), a portion of the Tank-Automotive Command (TACOM) Research, Development, and Engineering Center, a portion of the Belvoir Research, Development, and Engineering Center, and a portion of the Night Vision and Electro-Optics Laboratory (NVEOL).

The Consolidation of Research Elements which formed ARL's Directorates in 1992
Advanced Computational and Information Sciences Directorate
Ballistic Research Laboratory (computer technology elements)
Army Institute for Research in Management Information Communications and Computer Sciences
Battlefield Environment Directorate
Atmospheric Sciences Laboratory
Electronics and Power Sources Directorate
Electronics Technology and Devices Laboratory
Harry Diamond Laboratories (microelectronics elements)
Human Research and Engineering Directorate
Human Engineering Laboratory
Systems Research Laboratory (MANPRINT elements)
Materials Directorate
Materials Technology Laboratory
Belvoir Research, Development, and Engineering Center (basic and applied materials research elements)
Sensors, Signatures, Signal and Information Processing Directorate
Harry Diamond Laboratories
Signatures, Sensors, and Signal Processing Technology Organization
Night Vision and Electro-Optics Laboratory (research and development elements)
Survivability/Lethality Analysis Directorate
Vulnerability Assessment Laboratory
Ballistic Research Laboratory (vulnerability analysis elements)
Harry Diamond Laboratories (analytical functions for nuclear weapons)
Survivability Management Office
Chemical Research, Development, and Engineering Center (survivability analysis elements)
Vehicle Propulsion Directorate
Tank-Automotive Command Research, Development, and Engineering Center
Army Air Mobility Research and Development Laboratory (Army Propulsion Directorate)
Vehicle Structures Directorate
Materials Technology Laboratory (structures elements)
Army Air Mobility Research and Development Laboratory (Army Aerostructures Directorate)
Weapons Technology Directorate
Ballistic Research Laboratory
Harry Diamond Laboratories (technology base research functions for nuclear weapons)
Low Observable Technology and Application Office
Survivability Management Office

The U.S. Army formally activated the U.S. Army Research Laboratory on October 2, 1992, with Richard Vitali, the former LABCOM Director of Corporate Laboratories, positioned as acting director and Colonel William J. Miller as deputy director. Once ARL established Adelphi and Aberdeen Proving Ground as the laboratory's two main campuses, LABCOM's research activities at Watertown were transferred to ARL's Aberdeen site, while the activities at Fort Monmouth were moved to Adelphi.

=== Early History (1992–2002) ===
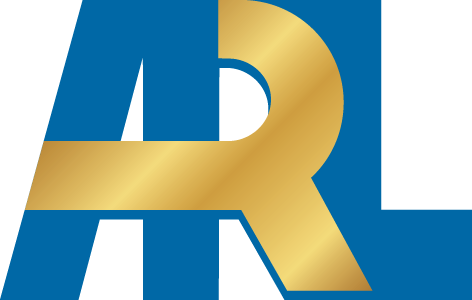
An early logo of ARL.

Upon creation, the U.S. Army Research Laboratory became responsible for advancing the long-term scientific and technological goals of the U.S. Army. Having absorbed the research laboratories that constituted LABCOM, ARL inherited LABCOM’s duties and functions, including the central management of the Army’s fundamental research efforts to enable the transition of new technologies into fielded systems. Like LABCOM, ARL concentrated on executing in-house basic and applied research, whose results informed the direction of materiel development for AMC’s Research, Development and Engineering Centers (RDECs) and other customers in the Army acquisition process. This arrangement paralleled the industry model where a central laboratory provides product development support to multiple research and development centers, thus signaling ARL’s identity as the Army’s corporate laboratory. ARL was also expected to cultivate and maintain a high level of in-house scientific and engineering knowledge to provide technical advice to U.S. Army leaders and perform technology assessments in continuation of LABCOM’s “smart buyer” service.

From the outset, ARL’s strategic trajectory shifted significantly in response to the changing needs and priorities of the Army following Operation Desert Storm and the collapse of the Soviet Union. Army funding for LABCOM underwent a steep decline since the fall of the Berlin Wall in 1989, and additional cuts to defense spending brought about by the end of the Cold War placed significant financial pressure on the newly formed ARL. At the same time, the outcome of the Gulf War demonstrated the importance of technological superiority in modern warfare, and the Army sought to preserve its advantageous position at the forefront of technological development. After Operation Desert Storm, U.S. Army Chief of Staff General Gordon R. Sullivan directed AMC to develop technology that would “digitize the battlefield” by enabling real-time situational awareness for battlefield commanders at all levels. ARL was subsequently tasked with developing the scientific underpinnings of this envisioned technology as its new mission while facing pressures to downsize at the same time. These conditions prompted ARL to change its approach to how it carried out fundamental research.

In December 1994, ARL’s first director John W. Lyons launched a laboratory reform campaign based on a new concept of operations called the Federated Laboratory, or FedLab. The FedLab approach leveraged the private sector’s existing research infrastructure in information technology, which had surpassed that of the military, to advance the Army’s goals in developing and fielding its own wireless digital communications technology for the battlefield environment. At the same time, this partnership revealed insights into Army requirements to industry, promoted the development of dual-use solutions, and increased the integration of commercial standards and products in the Army. For this plan, ARL employed the Department of Defense’s newly acquired authority to execute cooperate agreements to forge a closer working partnership with the private sector. The use of cooperative agreements allowed ARL to jointly plan and execute technical programs with the agreement recipients, whereas standard contractual processes precluded ARL researchers from engaging in the technical work as active participants. Through this arrangement, ARL could establish a consortium with partners in industry and academia where the private sector leads the advancement of a technology area while ARL’s in-house capabilities and knowledge base keep the research aligned with the Army’s strategic objectives. In January 1996, ARL entered into five-year cooperative agreements with multiple industry and university partners to establish three consortia—one for advanced sensors, one for telecommunications, and one for display technology. ARL concluded the FedLab consortia in 2001. Over the duration of the initiative, ARL oversaw staff exchanges with its private sector partners to cement gains in scientific and institutional knowledge, having a fifth of the partners’ technical staff working at ARL and an equivalent number of ARL staff working in the partners’ laboratories at any given time. ARL then transitioned the FedLab concept to establish the Collaborative Technology Alliances (CTA) program as the laboratory’s primary mechanism for executing large-scale collaboration initiatives with the private sector.

The FedLab reform campaign also entailed significant internal restructuring to streamline ARL’s support functions to increase efficiency and enhance organizational cohesion in the face of significant personnel drawdown. Beginning in April 1995, the bulk of the Sensors, Signatures, Signal and Information Processing Directorate (S^{3}I) merged with portions of the Electronics and Power Sources Directorate (EPSD) to form the Sensors Directorate (SEN). The remaining Information Processing Branch of S^{3}I joined the Military Computer Science Branch of the Advanced Computational and Information Sciences Directorate (ACIS), the bulk of the Battlefield Environment Directorate (BED), and portions of EPSD to create the Information Science and Technology Directorate (IST). While the rest of EPSD became the Physical Sciences Directorate (PSD), the remainder of ACIS was reorganized into the Advanced Simulation and High-Performance Computing Directorate (ASHPC). BED's Atmospheric Analysis and Assessment team was also transitioned into the Survivability/Lethality Analysis Directorate (SLAD). In 1996, ARL underwent further restructuring in response to calls by the U.S. Army to decrease the number of directorates. The laboratory formed the Weapons and Materials Research Directorate (WMRD) by combining the Weapons Technology Directorate and the Materials Directorate. It also created the Vehicle Technology Center (VTC) by combining the Vehicle Propulsion Directorate and the Vehicle Structures Directorate. SEN and PSD were merged to form the Sensors and Electron Devices Directorate (SEDD), and ASHPC became the Corporate Information and Computing Center (CICC). By 1997, ARL managed only five technical directorates (WMRD, IST, SEDD, HRED, and SLAD) and two centers (VTC and CICC).

During this period, ARL also expanded its research infrastructure with the creation of new research facilities. Among these infrastructure projects was the large-scale construction of a new physical sciences laboratory complex at the Adelphi site. The project at Adelphi, which began in 1995, oversaw the development of a 370,000-square-foot building designed to accommodate research in sensors, high-performance computing, and microelectronics, including a Class 1,000 clean room. The laboratory complex formally opened in 1999 as the Zahl Physical Sciences Laboratory in honor of Harold A. Zahl, a U.S. Army Signal Corps research physicist who invented the VT-158 vacuum tube.

In 1998, ARL officially incorporated the Army Research Office (ARO) into its organization. Until this point, ARO had existed separately from the other former LABCOM elements. As a part of this change, ARO's director became the ARL deputy director for basic research. Shortly thereafter, the Corporate Information and Computing Center was renamed to the Corporate Information and Computing Directorate, and the Vehicle Technology Center was renamed to the Vehicle Technology Directorate. In May 2000, ARL combined the Information Science and Technology Directorate and the Corporate Information and Computing Directorate to form the Computational and Information Sciences Directorate (CISD). With this change, ARL administered, in total, the Army Research Office and six technical directorates.

The Reorganization of ARL Directorates from 1995 to 2000
Inception	1995	1996	2000
Sensors, Signatures, Signal and Information Processing Directorate	Sensors Directorate	Sensors and Electron Devices Directorate	Sensors and Electron Devices Directorate
Electronics and Power Sources Directorate (three branches)	Sensors Directorate	Sensors and Electron Devices Directorate	Sensors and Electron Devices Directorate
Electronics and Power Sources Directorate	Physical Sciences Directorate	Sensors and Electron Devices Directorate	Sensors and Electron Devices Directorate
Battlefield Environment Directorate	Information Science and Technology Directorate	Information Science and Technology Directorate	Computational and Information Sciences Directorate
Advanced Computational and Information Sciences Directorate (Military Computer Science Branch)	Information Science and Technology Directorate	Information Science and Technology Directorate	Computational and Information Sciences Directorate
Sensors, Signatures, Signal and Information Processing Directorate (Information Processing Branch)	Information Science and Technology Directorate	Information Science and Technology Directorate	Computational and Information Sciences Directorate
Electronics and Power Sources Directorate (small portion)	Information Science and Technology Directorate	Information Science and Technology Directorate	Computational and Information Sciences Directorate
Advanced Computational and Information Sciences Directorate	Advanced Simulation and High-Performance Computing Directorate	Corporate Information and Computing Center	Computational and Information Sciences Directorate
Survivability/Lethality Analysis Directorate	Survivability/Lethality Analysis Directorate	Survivability/Lethality Analysis Directorate	Survivability/Lethality Analysis Directorate
Battlefield Environment Directorate (Atmospheric Analysis and Assessment team)	Survivability/Lethality Analysis Directorate	Survivability/Lethality Analysis Directorate	Survivability/Lethality Analysis Directorate
Weapons Technology Directorate	Weapons Technology Directorate	Weapons and Materials Research Directorate	Weapons and Materials Research Directorate
Materials Directorate	Materials Directorate	Weapons and Materials Research Directorate	Weapons and Materials Research Directorate
Human Research and Engineering Directorate	Human Research and Engineering Directorate	Human Research and Engineering Directorate	Human Research and Engineering Directorate
Vehicle Propulsion Directorate	Vehicle Propulsion Directorate	Vehicle Technology Center	Vehicle Technology Directorate
Vehicle Structures Directorate	Vehicle Structures Directorate	Vehicle Technology Center	Vehicle Technology Directorate

=== Later History (2002–Present) ===
Later logo of ARL.

In October 2002, General Paul J. Kern, the newly appointed commanding general of AMC, created the U.S. Army Research, Development and Engineering Command (RDECOM) to consolidate all of AMC’s research and engineering facilities under one command structure. The Army officially established RDECOM as a major subordinate command under AMC on March 1, 2004. Positioned at the center of Army technology development, RDECOM was given authority over ARL, the RDECs, the Army Materiel Systems Analysis Activity, and a portion of the Simulation, Training and Instrumentation Command. ARL, which had previously reported directly to AMC headquarters, henceforth reported to RDECOM instead.

Throughout the 2000s and early 2010s, ARL concentrated chiefly on addressing the operational technical challenges that arose during Operation Enduring Freedom and Operation Iraqi Freedom. Although long-term fundamental research traditionally represented the crux of ARL's work, heavy pressure from Army leadership redirected much of the laboratory's attention towards quick-fix solutions in response to urgent problems faced by troops in theater. Examples include the Armor Survivability Kit for the M998 HMMWV, the Mine Resistant Ambush Protected (MRAP) vehicles, the Rhino Passive Infrared Defeat System, and the M1114 HMMWV Interim Fragment Kit 5.

In 2014, ARL launched the Open Campus pilot program as part of the laboratory's new business model. Designed to help ARL obtain new perspectives on Army problems and keep the laboratory connected with early-stage scientific innovations, the Open Campus program prioritized the development of a collaborative network that ARL could leverage to accelerate technology transfer. The initiative also facilitated the creation of the ARL regional sites, which established research outposts at strategic university campus locations across the continental United States. The ARL regional sites stationed Army research personnel close to local and regional universities, technical centers, and companies for the purposes of developing partnerships and fostering interest in Army-relevant research. The first regional site, ARL West, was established in Playa Vista, California, on April 13, 2016. The second regional site, ARL South, was established in Austin, Texas, on November 16, 2016. The third regional site, ARL Central, was established in Chicago, Illinois, on November 10, 2017. The fourth regional site, ARL Northeast, was established in Burlington, Massachusetts, on April 9, 2018, in what was believed to be the laboratory's final extended campus location.

On July 1, 2018, the Army formally established the U.S. Army Futures Command (AFC) as the Army's fourth major command alongside the U.S. Army Materiel Command, the U.S. Army Training and Doctrine Command, and the U.S. Army Forces Command. The formation of AFC served to consolidate the Army's modernization efforts under a single command. As a result, the Army transitioned RDECOM from AMC to AFC on February 3, 2019, and renamed it to the U.S. Army Combat Capabilities Development Command (CCDC). Although ARL retained its position as an element of CCDC during this transition, one of ARL's directorates, SLAD, was moved out of the laboratory and incorporated into the newly established Data & Analysis Center under CCDC. The “CCDC” designation was also appended in front of the names of the eight research facilities assigned to the new major subordinate command: CCDC Armaments Center, CCDC Aviation & Missile Center, CCDC Army Research Laboratory, CCDC Chemical Biological Center, CCDC C5ISR, CCDC Data & Analysis Center, CCDC Ground Vehicle Systems Center, and CCDC Soldier Center.

In 2020, CCDC changed its abbreviation to DEVCOM, resulting in CCDC ARL becoming DEVCOM ARL. In 2022, DEVCOM ARL discontinued its technical directorates and adopted a competency-based organizational structure that realigned the laboratory's intramural and extramural research efforts to underscore the Army's targeted priorities in science and technology. In 2023, DEVCOM ARL established its fifth regional site, ARL Mid-Atlantic, in Aberdeen Proving Ground, Maryland.

On October 2, 2025, Army officials inactivated Army Futures Command and activated the U.S. Army Transformation and Training Command (T2COM). This organizational change positioned DEVCOM (including DEVCOM ARL), under the new U.S. Army Futures and Concepts Command (FCC), a subordinate command of T2COM.

== Predecessor laboratories ==
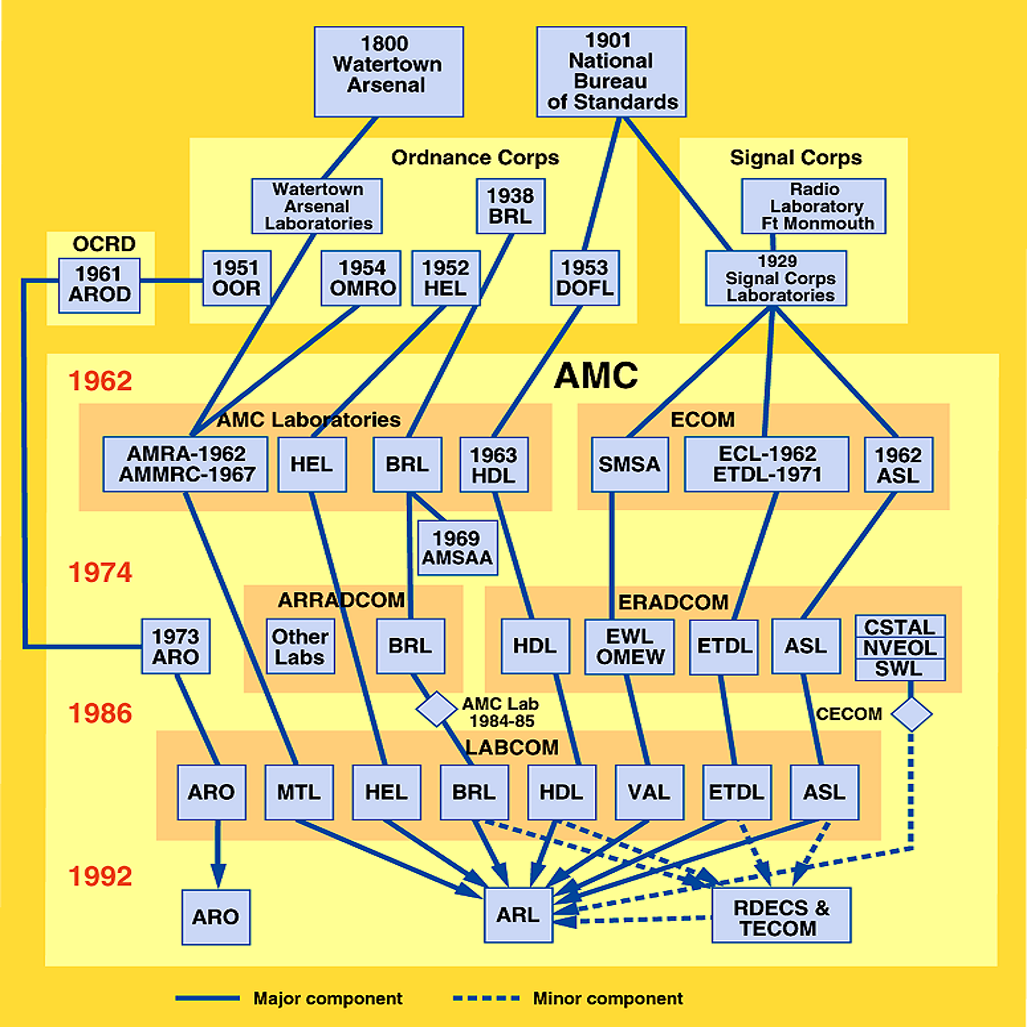
The genealogy of the seven LABCOM laboratories that consolidated to form ARL stretch as far back as the early 20th century.

=== Atmospheric Sciences Laboratory ===
The Atmospheric Sciences Laboratory was a U.S. Army Materiel Command research laboratory that conducted research in artillery meteorology, electro-optical climatology, atmospheric optics data, and atmospheric characterization from 1965 to 1992.

=== Ballistic Research Laboratory ===
The Ballistic Research Laboratory was a research laboratory in the U.S. Army Ordnance Corps and later the U.S. Army Materiel Command that specialized in interior, exterior, and terminal ballistics and vulnerability and lethality analysis. BRL served as a major Army center for research and development in technologies related to weapon phenomena, armor, accelerator physics, and high-speed computing. The laboratory is perhaps best known for commissioning the creation of the Electronic Numerical Integrator and Computer (ENIAC), the first electronic general-purpose digital computer.

=== Electronics Technology and Devices Laboratory ===
The Electronics Technology and Devices Laboratory was a U.S. Army Materiel Command research laboratory that developed and integrated critical electronic technologies, such as high-frequency devices and tactical power sources, into Army systems. ETDL served as the U.S. Army's central laboratory for electronics research from 1971 to 1992.

=== Harry Diamond Laboratories ===
The Harry Diamond Laboratories was a research laboratory under the National Bureau of Standards and later the U.S. Army that conducted research and development in electronic components and devices. It was at one point the largest electronics research and development laboratory in the U.S. Army. HDL also acted as the U.S. Army's lead laboratory in nuclear survivability studies and operated the Aurora Pulsed Radiation Simulator, the world's largest full-threat gamma radiation simulator. The laboratory was best known for its work on the proximity fuze.

=== Human Engineering Laboratory ===
The Human Engineering Laboratory was a U.S. Army Materiel Command research laboratory that conducted research in human performance, human factors engineering, robotics, and human-in-the-loop technology. HEL acted as the Army's lead laboratory for human factors and ergonomics research from 1951 to 1992. Researchers at HEL investigated methods to maximize combat effectiveness, improve weapons and equipment designs, and reduce operation costs and errors.

=== Materials Technology Laboratory ===
The Materials Technology Laboratory was a U.S. Army Materiel Command research laboratory that carried out research in metallurgy and materials science for ordnance and other military purposes. MTL's early contributions date back to the 19th century when it supported the ordnance activities of Watertown Arsenal.

=== Vulnerability Assessment Laboratory ===
The Vulnerability Assessment Laboratory was a U.S. Army Materiel Command research laboratory that specialized in missile electronic warfare, vulnerability, and surveillance. VAL was responsible for assessing the vulnerability of weapons and electronic communication systems to hostile electronic warfare and coordinating missile electronic countermeasure efforts for the U.S. Army.

== List of directors ==
No.	Director		Term		
No.	Portrait	Name	Took office	Left office	Duration
-	Richard Vitali	Richard Vitali; Acting	October 2, 1992	September 14, 1993	347 days
1	John W. Lyons	John W. Lyons	September 14, 1993	December 31, 1998	5 years, 108 days
2	Robert W. Whalin	Robert W. Whalin	December 31, 1998	March 2003	~4 years, 59 days
3	John M. Miller	John M. Miller	March 2003	June 2012	~9 years, 92 days
-	John M. Pellegrino	John M. Pellegrino; Acting	July 1, 2012	March 11, 2013	253 days
4	Thomas Russell	Thomas Russell	March 11, 2013	April 2016	~3 years, 21 days
5	Philip Perconti	Philip Perconti	April 2016	November 22, 2019	~3 years, 235 days
6	Patrick J. Baker	Patrick J. Baker	December 8, 2019	September 30, 2025	5 years, 296 days
-	Eric L. Moore	Eric L. Moore; Acting	October 1, 2025	June 12, 2026	~254 days
-	Kimberly Ploskonka	Kimberly Ploskonka; Acting	June 15, 2026	Incumbent	~90 days

== See also ==
- United States Army Combat Capabilities Development Command (DEVCOM)
- US Army DEVCOM Armaments Center (DEVCOM AC) – formerly Army Armaments Research, Development and Engineering Center
- US Army DEVCOM Aviation & Missile Center (DEVCOM AvMC) – formerly Aviation and Missile Research, Development and Engineering Center
- US Army DEVCOM C5ISR Center (DEVCOM C5ISRC) – formerly Communications-Electronics Research, Development and Engineering Center
- US Army DEVCOM Chemical Biological Center (DEVCOM CBC) – formerly Edgewood Chemical Biological Center
- US Army DEVCOM Ground Vehicle System Center (DEVCOM GVSC) – formerly Tank Automotive Research, Development and Engineering Center
- US Army DEVCOM Soldier Center (DEVCOM SC) – formerly Natick Soldier Research, Development and Engineering Center
- United States Naval Research Laboratory
- United States Air Force Research Laboratory
