= VT-158 =

Vacuum tube

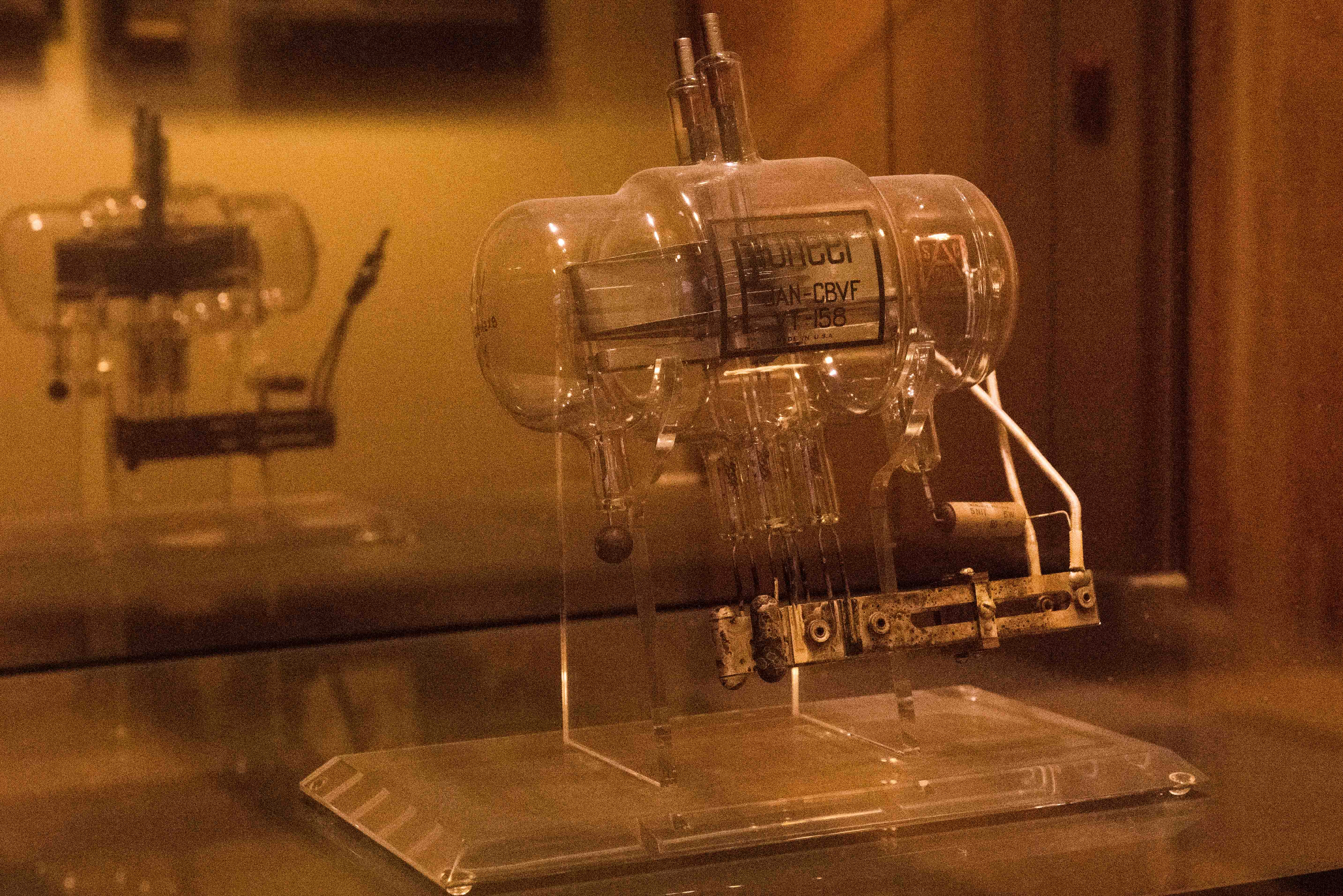
A VT-158 on display at the U.S. Army Research Laboratory headquarters

The VT-158, also known as the Zahl tube, was a vacuum tube invented by American physicist Harold A. Zahl in the 1930s and used during World War II and the Korean War. It allowed the radar technology at the time to detect low-flying planes by generating enough power to produce ultrahigh frequency energy.

== Background ==
The VT-158 was a major component of the AN/TPS-3 Lightweight Radar, known as the “Tipsy Three,” and the TPQ-3 mortar locating set. The invention made single antenna systems possible for Army and Air Corps early warning radars and pushed radar into the megacycle operating range. It consisted of four triode tubes connected in parallel and two elliptical circuits contained within a cylindrical glass envelope. The cathode was a cylinder made out of a suitable cathode metal like sheet nickel that was secured in coaxial relation to the cathode lead. The coaxial relation of the cathode and cathode lead was what allowed for efficient conduction of high radio frequency energy. On the other hand, the anodes were sheet metal cylinders made out of a heat-resistant metal such as tantalum. In addition, the anode leads passed through upwardly-directed glass stems, while the cathode leads passed downwardly through glass stems, making the two grid leads remote from each other. The large area of the cylindrical cathode also allowed for more electron emission. However, in order to heat the cathode, an oxide coating made out of barium, strontium, or a combination of these compounds was used to ensure that the cathode could operate at relatively low temperature and thus not require more than a simple internal heater filament to be heated. As a pulsed oscillator, the VT-158 had an operating frequency from 590 to 610 MHz and a peak power output of about 200 to 250 KW. Operation was at a plate voltage of about 20 KV with 1 to 2 microsecond pulses at a repetition rate of 240 pulses per second.

== History ==
=== Origins ===
In the early years of America's entry in World War II, the U.S. military set up early warning radar equipment along the coastlines over concerns regarding the country's defense against enemy bombers. After the surprise attack on Pearl Harbor, officials were worried that the enemy might target the Panama Canal in particular due to its importance in connecting military and shipping routes of the Atlantic and the Pacific. Since the western entrance to the Canal Zone did not have any land areas nearby that could be used as radar sites, the entrance was guarded by picket ships carrying radars. By 1942, thoughts shifted from passive air defense to Allied offensives, and the military leaders in the Air Force stressed the need for portable long-range aircraft detectors during their battles in the Pacific. However, American radar equipment at the time had a frequency ceiling of 200 megacycles, which made them not only vulnerable to surprise raids by low-flying aircraft but also extremely bulky and difficult to scale down.

Serving as a Signal Corps major at the Evans Signal Laboratory (which later became part of the Signal Corps Engineering Laboratories), Harold Zahl was charged with increasing the frequency of existing radar technology and reducing the size of bulky equipment as well as developing new radar tubes for Army ground forces and Air Corps. At the suggestion of Major General Roger B. Colton, Zahl had worked on the VT-158 for several years until it was finished in 1939 and later officially introduced in 1941. As a result of his invention, American radar technology could potentially reach a high frequency of 600 megacycles, allowing for smaller antennas. According to Zahl, tests of the vacuum tube were so successful that the equipment could obtain extremely long ranges and low angle coverage even from a set only 15 feet above sea level. Most notably, a very lightweight medium-warning radar could be constructed using the VT-158.

=== Implementation in SCR-602 ===
At the request of the U.S. Air Force, the Signal Corps was asked to develop a lightweight assault-type radar that could be both air transportable and hand-carried as well as have a range of over 100 miles on enemy bombardment aircraft. Prior to this request, the Air Force relied on the British lightweight warning (LW) radar, which the Signal Corps studied for ideas. After testing the VT-158 in various existing sets such as the SCR-268, a team led by Captain John Marchetti incorporated the VT-158 in a new system designated as the SCR-602. The original SCR-602, known as SCR-602-T1 for “Type 1”, was almost an exact copy of the British LW radar. With the implementation of the VT-158, Marchetti's team developed the SCR-602-T8 (Type 8), which was based on a modified SCR-268 used in the Canal Zone. In order to prove that the newly developed SCR-602-T8 was air transportable, the Signal Corps flew the first laboratory model in a Douglas B-18 Bolo from Newark Airport to a test site in Orlando, Florida on February 27, 1943. Upon arriving at its destination, the SCR-602-T8 was set up and calibrated for testing. At the end of the tests, the engineers determined that the model had a range in excess of 110 miles and could be mass-produced.

The SCR-602-T8, which was designated as the AN/TPS-3, soon became the most successful variant of the SCR-602 model. Consisting of a 10-ft parabolic reflector antenna with a horizontal polarized dipole radiator at its focus and a console with an A-scope and a PPI-scope, the AN/TPS-3 became widely used by Army and Marine forces for early warning at beachheads, isolated areas, and captured air bases. Furthermore, the AN/TPS-3 could be assembled and put on the air by a crew of four men in thirty minutes, making it easy to deploy. Many Japanese kamikaze aircraft attacks were reportedly foiled by this radar. By 1944, 900 sets of the SCR-602-T8 were manufactured by Zenith Radio Corporation, and the accompanying VT-158's were produced by Eitel-McCullough, Inc., a manufacturer of high-frequency transmitting tubes located near San Francisco. However, the exact number of VT-158's produced throughout the war remains unknown.

In addition to being sent to the Pacific, 200 AN/TPS-3 sets were delivered to Great Britain upon the request of the Air Vice Marshal of the Royal Air Force, R. B. Mansell, who told Major General Roger Colton of the Signal Corps:

“[T]his development is one of the most important in Ground Radar technique in recent years and that the designers are to be congratulated in producing a receiver, display and high power transmitter in a single unit measuring only 42 inches by 20 inches by 20 inches.”

During the D-Day invasion at Normandy, 24 AN/TPS-3 units protected soldiers from Luftwaffe fighter attacks.

=== Implementation in AN/TPQ-3 ===
In 1944, the Evans Signal Laboratory took part in a program to develop and field a radar system capable of detecting and locating hostile weapons with sufficient speed and accuracy to permit rapid and effective counter fire by friendly forces. Although it was a task that the MIT Radiation Laboratory considered impossible to finish before the end of the war, the engineers at the Evans Signal Laboratory modified the AN/TPS-3 into a mortar-locating radar known as the AN/TPQ-3. According to Zahl, the engineers at the lab worked almost 96 hours of non-stop effort to prepare the AN/TPQ-3 in time for deployment in the Pacific. The AN/TPQ-3 is considered the first prototype radar unit for mortar protection. After the second World War, the VT-158 was used during the Korean War as part of the AN/TPQ-3 before its production was halted.

== See also ==
- Harold Zahl
- John Marchetti
- Signal Corps Laboratories
