= Harold A. Zahl =

American physicist (1904–1973)

- Born: August 24, 1904; Chatsworth, Illinois
- Died: March 11, 1973 (aged 68); Red Bank, New Jersey
- Citizenship: American
- Awards: Harry Diamond Award (1954); Army Decoration for Exceptional Civilian Service
- Scientific career
- Fields: Radar
- Workplaces: Signal Corps Laboratories; North Central College; University of Iowa
- Thesis: Reflection of Cadmium and Zinc Atoms from Sodium Chloride Crystals (1930)
- Military career
- Allegiance: United States of America
- Branch: United States Army
- Service years: 1942–1946
- Rank: Lieutenant colonel
- Awards: Legion of Merit

Harold Adelbert Zahl (August 24, 1904 – March 11, 1973) was an American physicist who had a 35-year career with the U.S. Army Signal Corps Laboratories, where he served as the director of research at Fort Monmouth and made major contributions to radar development. He invented the GA-4 Transmitter-Receiver Tube and the VT-158, which became known as the Zahl tube.

== Early life ==
Harold Zahl was born in Chatsworth, Illinois, the son of an Evangelical minister. While still in high school, he became an amateur radio operator (call letters 6BHI). He graduated in physics and mathematics from North Central College in Naperville, Illinois, in 1927, and then attended the University of Iowa where he earned an M.A. degree in 1929 and a Ph.D. degree in 1931, both in solid-state physics.

== Signal Corps Laboratories ==
Upon completing his doctorate, Zahl joined the staff of the Signal Corps Laboratories (SCL) at Fort Monmouth, New Jersey, which later became part of the U.S. Army Research Laboratory. At the same time, he was commissioned a first lieutenant in the U.S. Army Signal Corps. His first assignment was to provide assistance in coastal defense by installing undersea cables that picked up sounds from ships and submarines to determine their exact location. Zahl recalled that this cable-laying operation was initially misinterpreted by the locals as an attempt to impede rum runners, which led to many of the cables being cut overnight.

As a research physicist for the Signal Corps, Zahl worked on numerous projects involving acoustics, infrared, electron tubes, and radar. His initial work at the SCL was in research on detecting aircraft using thermal radiation from their engines. In 1933, he invented a thermal detector that was capable of detecting a lit cigarette about 100 feet away. In 1934, he filed a patent application on "The Art of Locating Objects by Heat Radiation." Initially held up because of its classified nature, this was eventually granted in 1946.

In 1936, the SCL started research in Radio Position Finding (RPF – later called radar). Zahl participated in the development of the Army's first fielded RPF system, the SCR-268. In 1938, Zahl conceived and patented a pneumatic cell detector that later became a major component in the SCR-268-T1, the U.S. Army's first radar set. While the SCR-268 was being completed, development of an improved RPF system started, and Zahl was assigned to lead the effort. In 1940, he invented the GA-4 Transmitter-Receiver Tube, a duplexer made it possible for the Army and Air Corps’ early-warning radars to transmit and receive signals from the same antenna. As a result, two configurations of the radar emerged: the SCR-270 (mobile) and the SCR-271 (fixed-site). These systems started to be fielded in 1940, and were used throughout the Second World War. The Japanese military stated that the mobile radar sets were a key factor in the American victory in the Pacific.

In 1942, he entered active military service as a major and was promoted to the rank of lieutenant colonel in 1945. During his time as a major in the Signal Corps, Zahl invented the VT-158, a vacuum tube that raised the frequency ceiling of radar from 200 megacycles to 600 megacycles and consequently reduced the size of the radar equipment. The VT-158, later known as the Zahl tube, became a vital component in the development of the AN/TPS-3, a lightweight, portable early warning radar, and the AN/TQS-3, a mortar-detection radar. A total of about 900 of AN/TPS-3 sets were built and used extensively by the Army, particularly in the Pacific Theater, as well as by Allied forces on D-Day during the invasion of Normandy.

== After the War ==
At the close of World War II, Zahl left active duty as a lieutenant colonel in 1946 and became a civilian employee at the Signal Corps Engineering Laboratories, where he promoted the continuation of scientific collaborations between universities, industry, and the military. In one case, Zahl worked closely with the Radiation Laboratory at MIT in their development of microwave radars. Later that same year, he became involved in the work with the Bikini Atomic Tests. In 1948, Zahl was named the director of research at Fort Monmouth's Camp Evans (later called the Army Electronics Command Laboratories). He was considered the first Army scientist to be promoted to top career status under Public Law 313 solely as a result of his accomplishments during a Civil Service career. During his tenure, Zahl was involved in the Space Race against the Soviet Union and spent much of his time tracking the path of Sputnik I when it launched in 1957. He was among the scientists who recognized from the outset the potential of the maser, the laser, the atomic clock, and satellites for practical uses in communications and meteorology.

Zahl retired in 1966 due to declining health. Over the course of his 35-year career at the Signal Corps Laboratories, he authored 50 technical publications in the fields of molecular and atomic physics, x-rays, acoustics, and thermodynamics. He also had several patents for work in radar, communications, electron tubes, infrared, and aircraft technology. In his spare time, Zahl wrote numerous science fiction stories under his own name and the pseudonym “Christopher James.”

== Recognition ==
Zahl was given several awards for his contributions to advancing electronic technologies. In 1946, the U.S. Army presented Zahl with the Legion of Merit for his work on electron tubes and radar. In 1954, he was given the IEEE Harry Diamond Memorial Award for “his technical contributions, his long service, and his leadership in the S. Army Signal Corps research program.” In 1962, he was awarded the Department of the Army Decoration for Exceptional Civilian Service, the highest honor conferred to Army civilian employees by the Department of the Army. He was also given the public service award of the Federal Business Association of New York in 1964.

On December 19, 1948, radio news commentator Walter Winchell described Zahl as "the Army’s greatest scientist," and remarked on his Sunday program: "His radar inventions drove Hitler to suicide…."

== Death and legacy ==
Zahl was a resident of Holmdel Township, New Jersey, where he owned the Hazienda Evergreen Plantation, and died at Riverview Hospital in Red Bank on October 12, 1973. In 1997, the U.S. Army Research Laboratory (ARL) in Adelphi, MD, started a $73.9 million construction project on a building dedicated to Zahl called the Zahl Physical Sciences Facility. The complex opened in 1999 and housed ARL's Sensors and Electron Devices Directorate (SEDD) as of 2019.

== Bibliography ==
- Zahl, Harold A. (September 1930). "Reflection of Cadmium and Zinc Atoms from Sodium Chloride Crystals". Physical Review Letters. 36 (5). APS: 893–903. Bibcode:1930PhRv...36..893Z. doi:10.1103/PhysRev.36.893.
- Zahl, Harold A.; Golay, Marcel J. E. (1946). "Pneumatic Heat Detector". Review of Scientific Instruments. 17 (12). AIP Publishing: 511–515. Bibcode:1946RScI...17..511Z. doi:10.1063/1.1770416. PMID 20280202.
- Zahl, Harold A.; Marchetti, John W. (January 1946). "Radar on 50 Centimeters – The TPS-3 Radar". Electronics. McGraw–Hill: 98–104. ISSN 0013-5070. Archived from the original on 14 June 2015.
- Zahl, Harold A. (February 1952). "Physics in the Signal Corps". Physics Today. 5 (2). AIP: 16–19. Bibcode:1952PhT.....5b..16Z. doi:10.1063/1.3067477.
- Zahl, Harold A.; Reilley, Edward M. (August 1958). "Exploratory research". Physics Today. 11 (8). AIP: 20. Bibcode:1958PhT....11h..20Z. doi:10.1063/1.3062684.
- Zahl, Harold A.; Ziegler, Hans K. (January 1960). "Power sources for satellites and space vehicles". Solar Energy. 4 (1). Elsevier: 32–38. Bibcode:1960SoEn....4...32Z. doi:10.1016/0038-092X(60)90047-5.
- Zahl, Harold A. (April–July 1960). "From an Early Sputnik Diary". IRE Transactions on Military Electronics. MIL-4 (2–3). IEEE: 320–322. doi:10.1109/IRET-MIL.1960.5008242. S2CID 51647745.
- Zahl, Harold A. (October 1960). "One Hundred Years of Research". IRE Transactions on Military Electronics. MIL-4 (4). IEEE: 397–401. doi:10.1109/IRET-MIL.1960.5008264. S2CID 51674023.
- Zahl, Harold A. (November 1960). "Signal Corps centennial". Physics Today. 13 (11). AIP: 34–39. Bibcode:1960PhT....13k..34Z. doi:10.1063/1.3056707.
- Zahl, Harold A. (March 1961). "Looking Backward toward Tomorrow". IRE Transactions on Aeronautical and Navigational Electronics. ANE-8 (1). IEEE: 3–6. doi:10.1109/TANE3.1961.4201770. S2CID 51638613.
- Zahl, Harold A. (May 1962). "Fifty Years of Teaching Machines". Proceedings of the IRE. 50 (5). IEEE: 575–578. doi:10.1109/JRPROC.1962.288366. S2CID 51659348.
- Zahl, Harold A. (1968). Electrons away;: Or, Tales of a government scientist. Vantage Press. ASIN B0006BTL9O.
- Miller, Ronald I.; Snouse, Tom; Zahl, Harold A.; Clancy, Edward P. (April 1970). "More on employment". Physics Today. 23 (4). AIP: 10. Bibcode:1970PhT....23d..10M. doi:10.1063/1.3022056.
- Zahl, Harold A. (December 1970). "A Tale of Two Crises". Signal Magazine. Archived from the original on June 14, 2015.
- Zahl, Harold A. (1972). Radar Spelled Backwards. Vantage Press. ASIN B00221YBZ0.
