= John W. Marchetti =

American radar pioneer

John William Marchetti (June 6, 1908 – March 28, 2003) was a radar pioneer who had an outstanding career combining government and industrial activities. He was born of immigrant parents in Boston, Massachusetts, and entered Columbia College and Columbia School of Engineering and Applied Science (the undergraduate colleges of Columbia University) in 1925. In a six-year program combining liberal arts and engineering, he earned both A.B. and B.S. degrees, followed by the graduate E.E. (Electrical Engineering) degree in 1931. He was employed by New York Edison as a power engineer for several years, during which time he also participated in the U.S. Naval Reserve as an ensign.

== Army - Signal Corps Laboratories ==
In 1937, Marchetti obtained a civil service position in the Signal Corps Laboratories (SCL) at Fort Monmouth, New Jersey. He began as a junior radio engineer in the General Development Laboratory, running tests on the SCR-300, well known as the "Walkie-talkie" communications set. After receiving appropriate security clearances, he was transferred to the Radio Position Finding (RPF - early SCL designation for radar) section where Paul E. Watson, the SCL Chief Engineer, was leading the development of the Signal Corps's first pulsed detection system. His initial assignment was to design a 600-MHz transmitter for future RPF systems using the newly developed Doorknob tubes.

In December 1937, the 200-MHz experimental equipment was set up near the coast and detected aircraft at distances up to seven miles flying in and out of New York City. In early 1938, the RPF activities were moved to a more secure location at Fort Hancock in Sandy Hook, a peninsula reaching into the New York Harbor. Watson's initial system was designated SCR-268, and two other systems soon evolved, the SCR-270 (mobile) and SCR-271 (fixed site). Marchetti continued work on 600-MHz devices as well as on the other three systems. Before the end of 1940, all of these were placed into production and had limited deployment.

During 1941, the SCL again relocated, this time to Camp Evans, a site a few miles south of Fort Monmouth. Here it was called the Evans Signal Laboratory, with Watson, now a lieutenant colonel, serving as the director.

One of the first SCR-270s was in service on the island of Oahu on December 7, 1941. At 7:20 a.m., the operators reported detecting a flight of planes due north, but the duty officer dismissed it as "nothing unusual" and the alarm went unheeded. At 7:53 a.m., the Japanese hit Pearl Harbor.

With the entry of the U.S. into war, most of the personnel at the SCL were commissioned into the Army; Marchetti was made a captain. Following the surprise bombing of Pearl Harbor, there was a crash program to obtain radars to protect the Panama Canal Zone from a similar attack. To detect low-flying aircraft at a range allowing sufficient warning, a high-frequency radar system for picket ships stationed 100 miles offshore was needed. Coworker Harold A. Zahl had developed a tube (VT-158) that gave up to 240 kW pulse power at 600 MHz. (This was actually four triodes and their associated circuitry tightly packaged in one glass envelope.) Marchetti led a 20-person team in adapting the SCR-268s for using this tube; the project was completed in a few weeks, with the first set installed on the M.S. Nordic.

As U.S. troops began the recapture of islands in the Pacific Theater of Operations, there was an urgent need for a portable radar to provide medium-range early warning against aircraft. Again Marchetti was assigned the task of developing a suitable system. In only a few days, Marchetti and his team converted the picket-ship radar into the AN/TPS-3, a lightweight, transportable system that could be assembled and placed into operation by a small crew in 30 minutes. Somewhat later, the set was modified as a mortar-locating radar, the AN/TPQ-3. During the war, about 900 of these early-warning and mortar-locating systems were built, including 24 sets used in the D-Day Normandy landing.

For the continuing war years, Marchetti was engaged in a wide variety of radar projects. One of the largest activity was his support to the Rad Lab at MIT in developing a mobile, gun-laying, microwave system, eventually designated the SCR-584. Undoubtedly the best-known radar system of the war, this included the M-9 analog computer that set the stage for great post-war advances in this field.

Attacks on England by German V-1 flying bombs began in early 1944. Several SCR-268 systems upgraded to 600 MHz were rushed to England and set up on the coast to direct the anti-aircraft guns. When first used, the radar-directed guns actually were reduced in their hits. Marchetti was sent to England to check the radars. He found the electronic function was correct; however, the signal being sent to the gun-aiming analog computer was not the direct reflection from the V-1 but a signal being reflected from the nearby English Channel. After a minor change in the equipment as well as in the operating procedure, the hit probability increased from a few percent to around 90 percent, subsequently saving thousands of lives. For his efforts, Marchetti was awarded the Order of the British Empire(OBE).

After correcting the SCR-268 operation, Marchetti remained in England, and in June 1944, he participated in the D-day liberation of Europe. Following the Omaha Beach landing in Normandy, he served as the radar officer for the First Army and was promoted to major. Among other duties, he searched in unsecured areas for German radar installations. After several months of service in Europe, he returned to Fort Monmouth. In 1999, the Federation of French War Veterans awarded Marchetti the Normandy Medal in recognition of his contributions.

== Air Force - Cambridge Research ==
In February 1945, the Army Air Forces took over from the Signal Corps a portion of the radar laboratories at Fort Monmouth, designating this activity the Watson Laboratories. At the conclusion of the war in May, Marchetti, now assigned to the Watson Laboratories, began recruiting scientists and engineers from the Rad Lab at MIT and the Radio Research Laboratory at Harvard University for employment at Air Forces laboratories.

The Watson Laboratories was authorized to establish the Cambridge Field Station (CFS), adjacent to MIT and Harvard. In September 1945, Marchetti was assigned as the Acting Commanding Officer of the CFS. Fifteen of the projects originally at the Rad Lab, together with the laboratory equipment, were transferred to the CFS. Also included were the testing facilities located at Hanscom Army Air Field at nearby Bedford, Massachusetts. By March 1946, the CFS had a staff of 770, including 350 scientists, engineers, and other technical personnel.

In November 1946, Marchetti, having received an honorable discharge from the Army as a lieutenant colonel, was named Chief of the Research Division, encompassing all of the technical activities of the CFS. This included four component laboratories (Antennas, RF Components, Electronic Components, and Electrical and Mechanical Engineering), and six systems laboratories (Ground Radar, Navigation, Communications, Relay Systems, Countermeasures, and Special Studies). Primary projects under Marchetti's responsibility at that time included the continued development of an experimental air-traffic control system (started at the Rad Lab); experimental launching of German V-2 rockets at White Sands Missile Range, New Mexico; and the development of VOLIR (Volumetric Indicating Radar), an automated scanning radar for the VolScan (Volume Scanning) air- traffic-control system.

In September 1947, the U.S. Army Air Forces became the U.S. Air Force, a separate service. The CFS was removed from under the Watson Laboratories and became an Air Force Base, later an Electronics Station. In December 1948, the Research Division was redesignated the Radio Physics Research Directorate of the CFS. Still directed by Marchetti, its significant accomplishments included the development of techniques for transmitting the output of radar sets over telephone networks (later called a modem) and a light gun (pen) for designating targets on a radar CRT to initiating a track (later used in the cursors for computer displays). Under Project Billboard, an experimental low-frequency, long-range radar was installed on the coast for sweeping the Atlantic Ocean.

The CFS was renamed the Air Force Cambridge Research Laboratories (AFCRL) in July 1949. At that time, the air-defense capability of the U.S. military was of great concern. Marchetti and George E. Valley, a former Rad Lab scientist who had joined the MIT physics faculty, established the Air Defense Systems Engineering Committee. Based on this committee, the Air Defense Project was officially formed at AFCRL in July 1950. From this, the first large-scale defense project since World War II evolved.

It was soon recognized that information from multiple radars would need to be handled by a central, high-performing, real-time computer; Marchetti proposed that the Whirlwind digital computer, under development by Jay W. Forrester at MIT, fit the requirements and should be used. (With the later addition of magnetic core memory, this was designated the AN/FSQ-7.) Coupled with the related developments from AFCRL (modems for transmitting radar signals and the light gun for handling displays), this eventually became the SAGE (Semi Automatic Ground Environment) air defense system for North America. The activity was first called Project Charles and later Project Lincoln; the latter was the foundation of the Lincoln Laboratory, a Federally Funded R&D Center of MIT.

The AFCRL operations began migrating to Hanscom AFB in Bedford during the early 1950s. In June 1951, the AFCRL was redesignated as the Air Force Cambridge Research Center (AFCRC), and Marchetti's operation was designated the Electronics Research Division (ERD). The AFCRC was placed under the command of Major General James F. Phillips in August, and Marchetti was named the Technical Deputy to the Commander. In addition to the ERD, the AFCRC had an Atomic Warfare Division and a Geophysics Research Division, all under the technical responsibility of Marchetti. By early 1952, the AFCRC had over 2,500 personnel, and the three Divisions were upgraded to Directorates.

Project Lincoln at MIT was under the cognizance of the ERD, and the integration of the project's radars became a major activity at the ERD. In March 1952, radar data was sent from Bedford to the Whirlwind computer at MIT over an 8-digit telephone link developed by the ERD, allowing the first fully automated aircraft interception using SAGE. By the end of 1952, there were 12 radars operating at Cape Cod in the experimental SAGE system.

Other major activities in 1952-1953 included completing the VolScan air-traffic control system with the computer containing the first desktop graphical user interface (GUI); establishing an Upper Air Observatory in New Mexico; opening an Arctic research station on Fletcher's Ice Island (T-3); participating in Project Buster-Jangle atomic tests in Nevada; conducting Project Moby Dick, a record-setting balloon flight for high-altitude research; and developing a high-performance analog computer for Tactical Air Traffic Control.

== Avco Corporation ==
Marchetti resigned from the AFCRC in May 1954. The Avco Corporation was developing their Research and Development Division (RAD) in Wilmington, Massachusetts, and Martchetti joined them in the fall of 1954 as the Director of the Electronics Research Laboratory. In a joint project between the U.S. Air Force and the Royal Canadian Air Force, the Pinetree Line (a series of fixed-position radars) was being built across Canada. This was an outgrowth of the successful Project Lincoln. In 1951, the Watson Laboratories had been moved to Griffiss AFB, New York, becoming the Rome Air Development Center (RADC); this Air Force center was responsible for the Pinetree radars.

Based on his early relationships with Watson Laboratories and experience on SAGE, Marchetti was able to obtain a contract from RADC for Avco RAD to design and build an experimental phased-array antenna system for allowing wide scanning on Pinetree and other future radars. Several AFCRC engineers were hired for this effort. Called the Steerable Array Radar and Communications (SARAC), the project was successfully completed, with a 15-by 15-foot prototype antenna having hundreds of transmitter and receiver elements that allowed multiple beams to be electronically scanned. Avco RAD was not successful in obtaining a production contract for the improved radars.

Avco Everett Research Laboratory, also located in the Boston area, had contracts with AFCRC that involved studying the plasma generated by re-entry vehicles. For this effort, Marchetti, at Avco RAD, developed a 30-MHz pulsed radar that was set up at San Salvador Island to observe the ionized trail from a NASA Mercury capsule. This radar was used in early 1961 to obtain data from the re-entry of flight MA-6. In a number of subsequent reports and papers, the instrument was referred to as the Marchetti radar.

== Marchetti, Inc. ==
In 1962, Marchetti, Inc., was formed in Natick, Massachusetts, with the primary objective of performing research and development on advanced radars. One of the first contracts was from RADC for designing and fabricating a wide-bandwidth radar transmitter. This operated between 1.224 and 1.386 GHz in the L-band using two traveling-wave tubes that produced 10-kW peak power. This was completed in 1963.

Another early contract from RADC was for developing a radar facility at the White Sands Missile Range, New Mexico, for re-entry measurements. For this, a 100-MHz AN/TPQ-20 radar was rebuilt with five Yagi antennas to receive vertically and horizontally polarized signals reflected from a test vehicle. During 1965–66, an in-depth analytical and experimental study was conducted for RADC to characterize performance of antenna array elements. This covered arrays with up to 1,000 elements and at frequencies from UHF through X-Band.

Although his firm had been reasonably successful in obtaining and performing advanced radar work, Marchetti was disappointed with the profitability of defense contracting and decided to change his field to rapid transportation. The High-Speed Ground Transportation Act of 1965 had opened the door to a new era of railway operations. The Budd Company teamed with Pennsylvania Railroad to develop the Metroliner, an electric, multiple unit, high-speed passenger train in which each car had its own locomotive unit using power drawn from catenary overhead lines.

In 1966, drawing on his experience in power systems when with New York Edison and his expertise in electro-mechanical control systems from radar development, Marchetti convinced Budd officials to use his firm for the electrical engineering work on the Metroliner. Although the main office for Marchetti, Inc., remained in Natick, the primary Metroliner activities were in Wilmington, Delaware, at the Penn Central (later Amtrak) maintenance yards. The Budd Metroliner prototype cars tested at 164 mph, and went into regular service on Penn Central lines between Washington, D.C., and New York City in early 1969; their speed, however, was limited to between 100 and 125 mph because of track conditions. In 1971, the cars were transferred to the newly formed Amtrak, but were still improved and maintained by Budd.

Marchetti, Inc., continued its relationship with Budd until 1978, mainly as a subcontractor but for a period as a subsidiary. These 12 years were a totally new career for Marchetti. An engineer who worked for the firm in the 1970s said that he found John Marchetti to be an outstanding electrical engineer but was totally unaware that he had an earlier career in radar.

== Closing ==
John Marchetti's wife, Sara, gave support that was instrumental throughout his career. They had one daughter, Nina M. Archabal, and one son, John W. Marchetti, Jr. Upon retirement, he returned to New Jersey and lived in Cherry Hill. He visited Camp Evans in January 1999, to give an oral history of his work there. In November 2000, he provided an oral history of his overall career for the National Museum of American History at the Smithsonian Institution. John W. Marchetti died on March 28, 2003, in Cherry Hill.
