= William R. Blair =

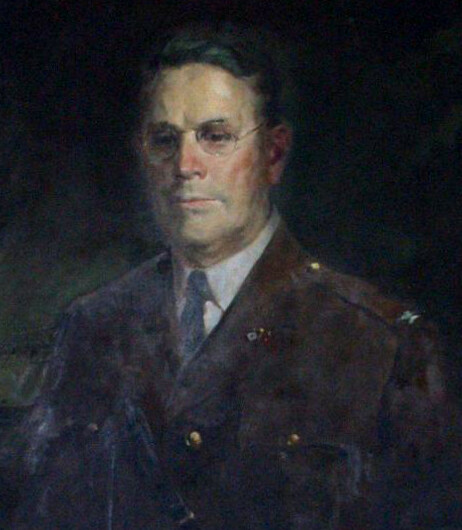
- Born: 7 November 1874; Derry, Ireland
- Died: 2 September 1962 (aged 89); Fair Haven, New Jersey, U.S.
- Citizenship: American: Kansas State Normal (1895); University of Chicago (Ph.D., 1906)
- Scientific career
- Fields: Radar
- Workplaces: Signal Corps Laboratories; U.S. Weather Bureau
- Thesis: The change of phase due to the passage of electric waves through thin plates and the index of refraction of water for such waves, with applications to the optics of thin films and prisms ... (1908)
- Doctoral advisor: Robert Andrews Millikan
- Military career
- Allegiance: United States of America
- Branch: United States Army
- Service years: 1917–1938
- Rank: colonel

William Richards Blair (7 November 1874 – 2 September 1962) was an American scientist and United States Army officer, who worked on the development of the radar from the 1930s onward. He led the U.S. Army's Signal Corps Laboratories during its formative years and is often called the "Father of American Radar".

== Early life, education, and teaching ==
Blair was born in Ireland in Derry on 7 November 1874, and brought to the United States by his parents when he was nine years old. His family settled in Kansas, where Blair graduated from Kansas State Normal School–now known as Emporia State University—in 1895. He was subsequently the principal of a high school in Pittsburg, Kansas for two years before moving on Oshkosh Normal School—now known as University of Wisconsin–Oshkosh—where he taught mathematics and physics from 1899 to 1902 and was the school's the head football coach for the 1901 season. He was awarded a Ph.D. in physics in 1906 from the University of Chicago, where he also served as an instructor. His doctoral dissertation involved experimental studies of microwave reflections, including those from non-metallic surfaces.

== Government and military career ==
After graduation from Chicago, Blair took a position with the United States Weather Bureau as a specialist in atmospheric sciences. There he prepared a major report, "Meteorology and Aeronautics," for the NACA (National Advisory Committee for Aeronautics, predecessor of NASA) that was widely circulated as a basic handbook. The theoretical portions of the report were published in a research journal.

When World War I began, physicist Robert Andrews Millikan recommended Blair to be commissioned as a major in the Aviation Section, U.S. Signal Corps reserves.

Blair was made the Chief Meteorologist for the American Expeditionary Force (AEF) and sailed to France in September 1917. Upon arrival Blair met with the British and French military weather services and established the exchange of weather information between the three. Blair established his headquarters at the Colombey-les-Belles Aerodrome and prepared the way for the over 300 officers and men who served as meteorological troops overseas.

Following the war, he remained in the Army as a meteorologist and participated in planning the first aerial circumnavigation in 1924. While attending the Command and General Staff College, he made a study of acoustical direction-finding for antiaircraft artillery, and soon realized that this could better be done using electromagnetic waves.

In 1917, the Army established the Signal Corps Radio Laboratories at Camp Vail, in eastern New Jersey. After the war, this became Fort Vail, then in 1925, it was renamed Fort Monmouth. In 1926, Blair was assigned as the Chief of Research and Engineering. Coupling capabilities in electronics and meteorology, in 1929 the Laboratory developed and launched the first radio-equipped weather balloon.

Going into the 1930s, the Great Depression with declining economic conditions led the Signal Corps to consolidate their widespread laboratories to Fort Monmouth. On 30 June 1930, the consolidated operations became the Signal Corps Laboratories (SCL), with Colonel Blair named the director.

In 1931, Blair initiated Project 88, "Position Finding by Means of Light." Here "light" was used in the general sense of electromagnetic radiation, including infrared and the very-short radio waves with line-of-sight transmission characteristics (microwaves). Some success was made with detection of thermal radiation from aircraft engines, but Blair was soon convinced that detection could best be done using reflected microwave signals.

After several years investigating microwave generating and receiving devices, followed by experiments in target detection using Doppler-beat interference methods, in 1935 Blair reported the following:

To date the distances at which reflected signals can be detected with radio-optical equipment are not great enough to be of value. . . . Consideration is now being given to the scheme of projecting an interrupted sequence of trains of oscillations against the target and attempting to detect the echoes during the interstices between the projections.

In 1936, a laboratory project in pulsed transmission and detection was started, and on December 14, the experimental apparatus detected an aircraft at 7 miles distance. Development then started on the Army's first system for Radio Position Finding (RPF) -- the name "radar" did not come into existence until 1940.

Blair's health failed during 1938, and he retired before the system was completed. This system, eventually designated SCR-268, was intended to aim searchlights.

In 1945, the Signal Corps applied, in Blair's name, for a patent titled "Object Locating System". This was based on the pulse-echo technique that was originally proposed by Blair in 1935. Because of secrecy, however, he was not allowed to apply for a patent until after the end of World War II, and his application was challenged by Raytheon, RCA, the United States Navy, and several companies; U.S. Patent No. 2,803,819 was not granted until 1957. Blair died five years later on 2 September 1962, in Fair Haven, New Jersey.

== Recognition ==
- 2004 New Jersey Hall of Fame Inductee

== Head coaching record ==
Year	Team	Overall	Conference	Standing	Bowl/playoffs
Oshkosh Normal (Independent) (1901)
1901	Oshkosh Normal	3–3			
Oshkosh Normal:		3–3			
Total:		3–3			
