= M9 gun director =

World War II electronic director

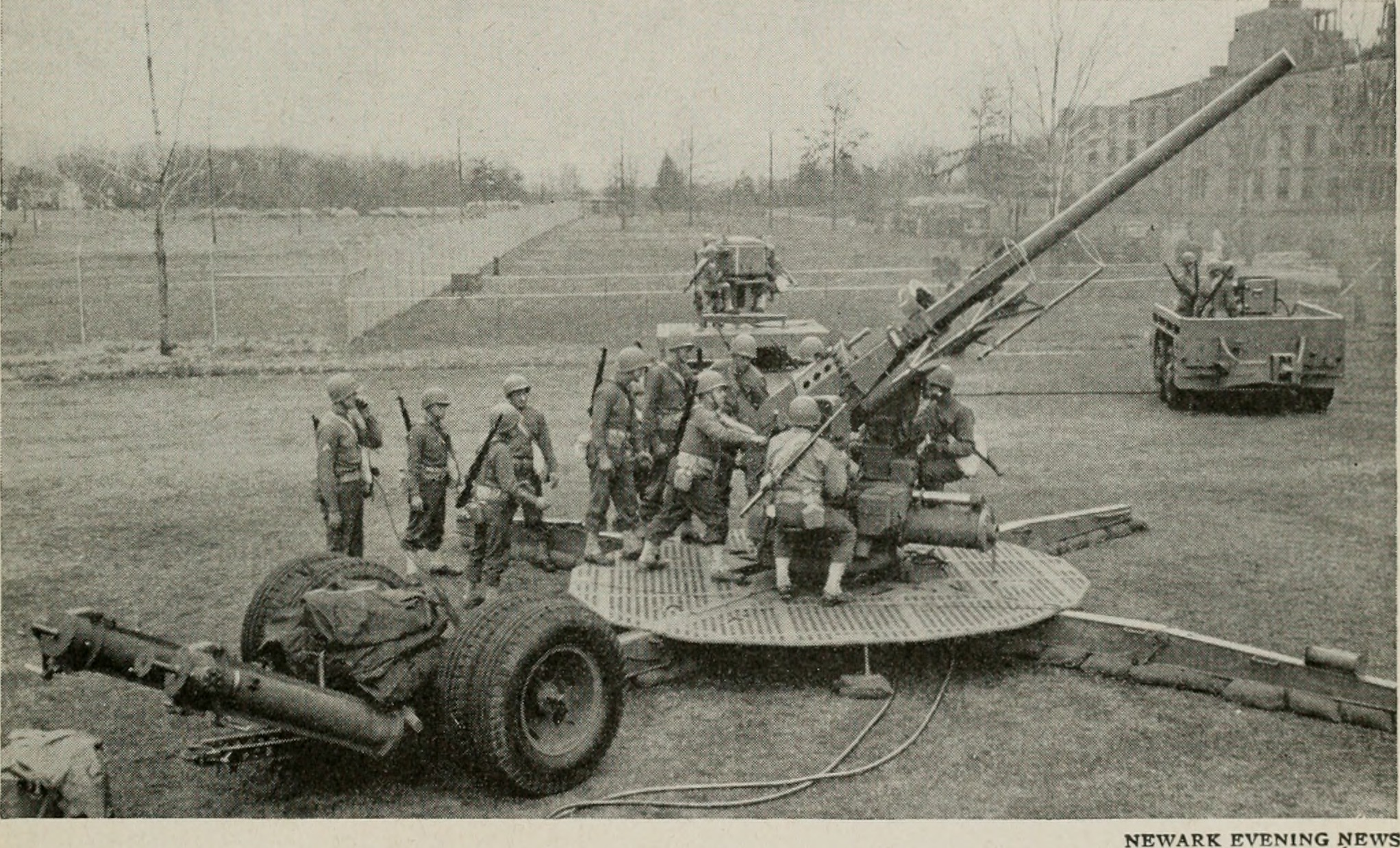
A US 90 mm anti-aircraft gun and crew during a demonstration at Bell Laboratories in 1943. The M9 gun director can be seen in the center background of the photo.

The M9 gun director was an electronic director developed by Bell Labs during World War II. This computer continuously calculated trigonometric firing solutions for anti-aircraft weapons against enemy aircraft. When cued by the SCR-584 centimetric gun-laying radar and used in concert with anti-aircraft guns firing shells with proximity fuzes, it helped form the most effective anti-aircraft weapon system utilized by the Allies during the war.

== Background ==
During the late 1930s the United States Army's signal corps attempted to utilize the newly developed SCR-268 radar to provide fire control quality data to the Sperry Corporation's M4 mechanical gun director. The SCR-268's longwave did not provide accurate enough data for the pairing to be an effective anti-aircraft weapon. In 1940, Vannevar Bush formed the National Defense Research Committee and its section D-2 was tasked with examining issues related to fire control headed by Warren Weaver.

== Development ==
In May 1940, an engineer at Bell named David Parkinson had a dream about being in an anti-aircraft revetment where he also spotted a potentiometer. He spent the next couple of weeks working with his boss to draft specifications for an analog computer that provided firing solutions for anti-aircraft guns. Later that year, Bell Labs, at the time led by Harvey Fletcher and Mervin Kelly, submitted a proposal to the National Defense Research Committee. Their proposed director would calculate course and speed of incoming aircraft, shell velocities and fuse timing, powder temperatures, shell drift, and air density and wind speeds to provide a predicted firing solution for the associated gun battery. The project was approved in December 1940 and the initial work on the project was completed by Drs. David B. Parkinson and Clarence A. Lovell under the direction of Dr. Edward Wente. A prototype, designated T-10, was delivered to the Army only a few days after the attack on Pearl Harbor and a few hundred sets were ordered immediately. As the SCR-584's development continued it was paired with the M9.

On November 9, 1943, a demonstration was held for senior Army leadership at the Bell Lab facility in Mullica Hill, New Jersey. Once operational testing was complete, the M9 was mass-produced at the Hawthorne Works in Cicero, Illinois.

== Operational use ==
90 mm anti-aircraft guns were normally operated in groups of four, utilizing the SCR-584 radar and being controlled by the M9 director. The SCR-584 was accurate to about 0.06 degrees (1 mil) and also provided automatic tracking. Direction and range information was sent directly to the M3 gun data computer, and M9 director, which directed and laid the guns automatically. All the crews had to do was load the guns.

SCR-584s with the associated M9 gun directors were rushed to the Anzio beachhead in February 1944 to assist with engaging the German-Italian air force that was jamming the SCR-268s and bombing the beachhead and harbor at night. On the evening of February 24, 1944, four American 90 mm guns opened fire on a flight of 12 Junkers Ju 88s, shooting down five of them. The success achieved that evening dramatically reduced German nighttime bombing moving forward.

In June 1944, the M9, working in concert with the SCR-584 and anti-aircraft batteries utilizing proximity fuses, formed the bulwark of defense against German V-1 flying bombs launched against southern England. Training and accuracy improved so that by the end of August, Allied crews were shooting down nearly two-thirds of incoming V-1s.

== See also ==
- Operation Diver
