= SCR-268 radar =

U.S. Army's first radar system

SCR-268
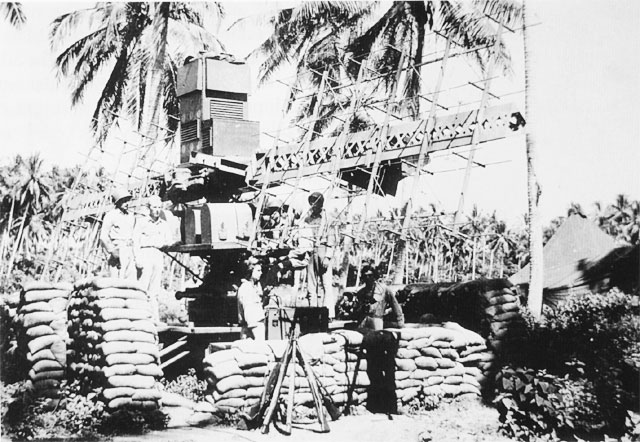
- SCR-268 radar deployed on Guadalcanal in August 1942
- Country of origin: United States
- Introduced: 1940
- Type: 2D air-search
- Frequency: 205 MHz
- Pulsewidth: 7 to 15 microseconds
- Range: 22.7 miles (36.5 km)
- Power: 50 kW peak

The SCR-268 (short for Set, Complete, Radio no. 268) was the United States Army's first radar system. Introduced in 1940, it was developed to provide accurate aiming information for antiaircraft artillery and was also used for gun laying systems and directing searchlights against aircraft. The radar was widely utilized by both Army and Marine Corps air defense and early warning units during World War II. By the end of World War II the system was already considered out of date, having been replaced by the much smaller and more accurate SCR-584 microwave-based system.

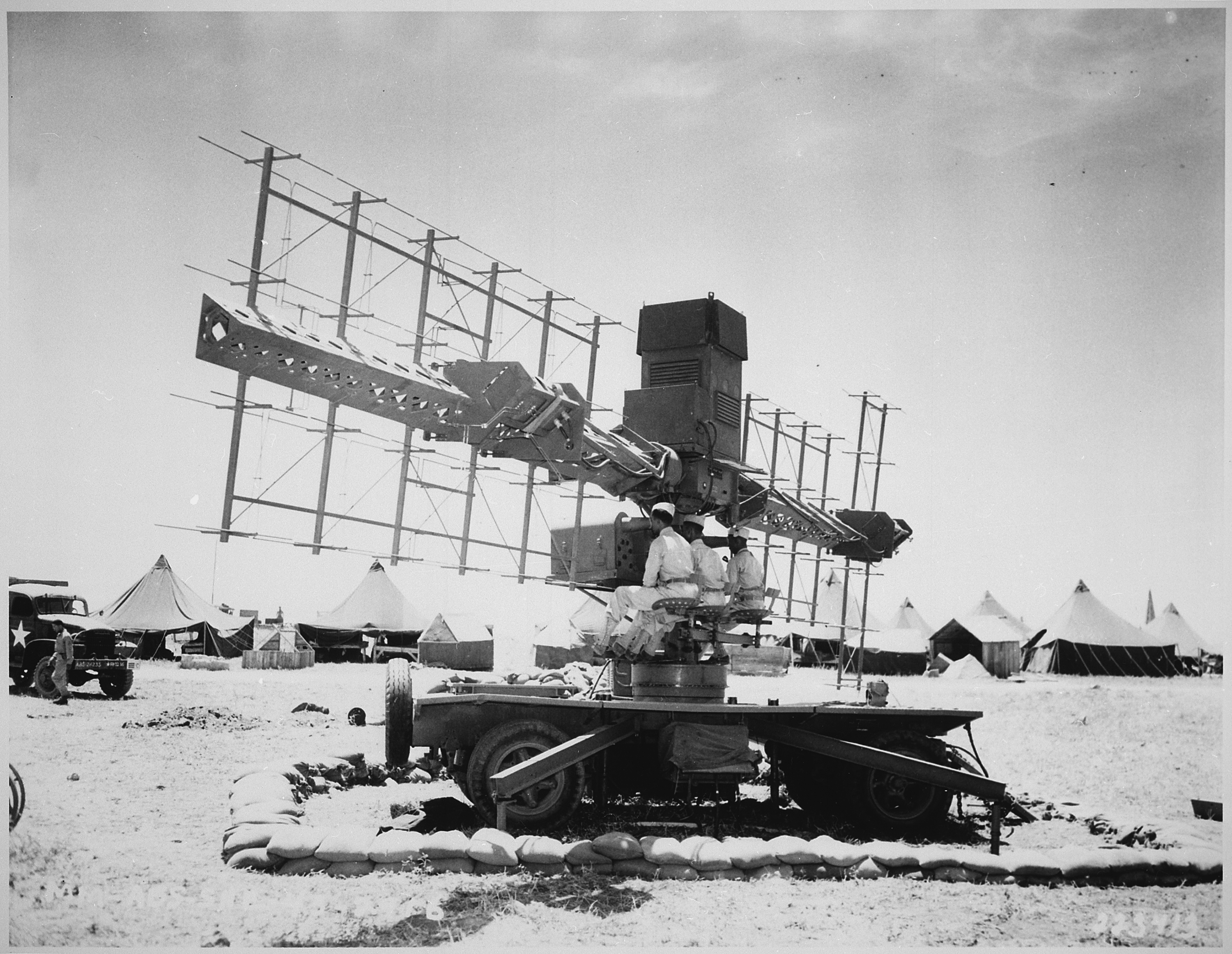
Three soldiers of the United States Army operate a radar used by the 90th Coast Artillery (Antiaircraft, Semimobile, Colored) in Casablanca

== Development ==
The Signal Corps had been experimenting with some radar concepts as early as the late 1920s, under the direction of Colonel William R. Blair, director of the Signal Corps Laboratories at Fort Monmouth, New Jersey. While most of the Corps' efforts revolved around infra-red detection systems (a popular idea at the time), as well as a newer generation of sound detectors, they also maintained a small program of research on microwave radars based on the "beat principle", in which an aircraft would cause two signals to interfere. Low generator efficiency and a lack of ranging capability made these efforts impractical.

In 1935 one of Blair's recent arrivals, Roger B. Colton, convinced him to send an engineer to investigate the US Navy's CXAM radar project after the bureau of Standards requested a proposal for radio detection of aircraft. The navy's system traced its development from experiments conducted by Albert H. Taylor and Leo C. Young at the United States Naval Research Laboratory in the early 1920s. William D. Hershberger duly went to see what they had, and returned an extremely positive report.

Gaining the support of James B. Allison, the Chief Signal Officer, they managed to gather a small amount of funding and "stole" some more from other projects. By December 1936 they had a working 3 meter prototype, which they continued to work on and improve. In November 1938 they were able to show the 1.5 meter prototype in a convincing demonstration for Hap Arnold. After failing to find their target Martin B-10 bomber where it was supposed to be, they started "hunting" for it and found it 10 miles off course. The radar fed pointing data to a team operating a searchlight, and when it was turned on the bomber was seen to be centered in the beam. It was later learned that the target had been blown off course, making the demonstration all the more impressive.

Development of this system was slowed to some degree when a long range early-warning radar became a higher priority and parts of the prototype were salvaged for the SCR-270 they were building. Nevertheless, the system entered production at Western Electric about the same time as the -270 in 1939. The radar entered service in 1940, and about 3100 were produced by the end of the war.

In 1944, the SCR-268 radar unit was beginning to be replaced by the SCR-584 radar. The SCR-268 was able to acquire and direct guns, or searchlights, on a target with a single piece of equipment.

== Description ==
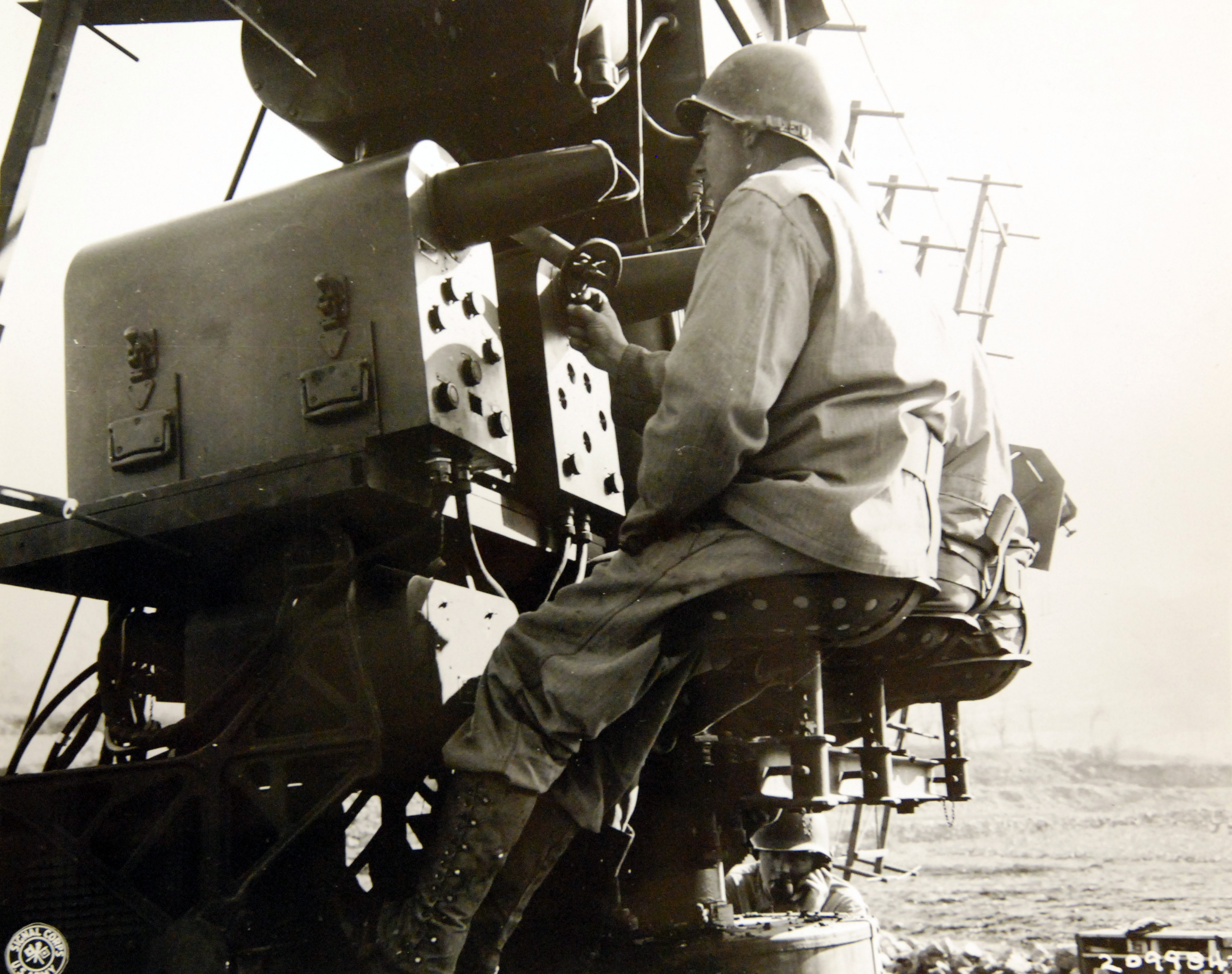
Oscilloscope operators with range scope at left, azimuth scope in middle, and the elevation scope at right

The SCR-268 antenna system consisted of a number of dipole elements arranged in three groups, each in front of a passive reflector, mounted on a large aimable cross. The cross consisted of a short upright pedestal sitting on top of a large base platform, mounting long cross-arms extending from the midpoint of the upright pedestal. The antenna system was about forty feet wide and ten feet high overall. Both the pedestal and the cross-arm could be rotated around their axis for aiming, in azimuth and altitude respectively.

The left side of the cross arm, as seen from the back, contained a set of dipoles that were set to be sensitive in angle, while almost insensitive to elevation. It was arranged six dipoles wide and four dipoles high, each with its own reflector. On the far right side was a similar, but smaller, arrangement rotated 90 degrees in order to be sensitive in elevation and not angle. This portion was two dipoles wide and six dipoles high with corresponding reflectors. Finally in the "middle" of the cross, between the upright pedestal and the elevation antenna, was the broadcasting array which created a circular beam about 10 degrees wide.

The three radar operators sat at consoles mounted on the pedestal just below the antenna cross-arm, each with their own oscilloscope display. One controlled the azimuth, another the elevation, and the third measured the range. Pointing the antenna was controlled by rotating large handwheels, the range being reported by a similar wheel.

The accuracy of the antennas themselves was not very high, about 9-12 degrees, so simply rotating the antenna and looking for a maximum would not point it very accurately. To help with this the antennas were deliberately designed to have two directions of high sensitivity, or "lobes". Signals from both lobes were displayed, slightly separated, on the layer's displays. By adjusting the antenna until the returns from both were equally strong, accuracies of about one degree were possible.

Range information was taken from the elevation array, and worked, as it did for most radars of the era, by triggering the trace on an "A-line" oscilloscope and read against a scale at the bottom. A second blip was also generated by equipment attached to the rangefinder's handwheel. By rotating the handwheel until the reference blip overlapped the one returned from the antenna, the timing could be read from the wheel. Range accuracy was about plus or minus 200 yards.

The system also included two sets of "repeaters" that sent the directional information to a searchlight, and both the directional and range (as dialed in on the rangefinder's handwheel) to a gun. The accuracy was not enough for direct gunlaying, but in combination with a searchlight the gun's existing optical equipment could "fine tune" the radar's guidance.

The radar operated at 205 MHz with a PRF of 4098 pulses per second of 6 μS (microsecond) duration, with an inter-pulse time of 240 μS. Radio waves (light) travel at about 0.093 miles/μS round-trip, so the system had a 22 miles (35 km) maximum range (240 × 0.093). It broadcast about 75 kW of power, which was, in theory, more than enough to offer longer range.

The radar was mobile, requiring four prime movers for support. Two towed the radar base and the antennas themselves, another pulled a K-34 trailer van providing power, and the fourth a van that converted the power to high voltage for the radio equipment. In total, including the trucks, the SCR-268 weighed 82,315 pounds. That the system was mobile at all was more a testament to the US's overwhelming industrial might than any quality of the radar itself.

The SCR-268 was combined with the Sperry M-4 gun director to create automatic radar-controlled gun laying; however, the relatively long wavelength (1.5 meters) resulted in poor accuracy. This system was eclipsed by the SCR-584, which utilized a 3 GHz magnetron oscillator from Britain, completely automatic tracking, and the Bell Telephone Laboratories electronic M9 gun director.

The SCR-268 was one of the first radar sets to use lobe switching of its receiving antennas as a means to aim AA (anti-aircraft) searchlight beams at aircraft. Since it did not lobe-switch its transmitted signal it would be classed as one of the first LORO (lobe-on-receive-only) radars.

== Scientific research ==
The Cornell University College of Engineering used two modified SCR-268 radar systems as radio telescopes in the late 1940s and early 1950s.

== Surviving examples ==
There are no known surviving examples of this array.

== See also ==
- List of U.S. Signal Corps Vehicles
- SCR-270 radar
- Signal Corps Radio
- G-numbers
