= Signal Corps Laboratories =

Defunct research facility of the United States Army

- Fort Monmouth, New Jersey in the United States
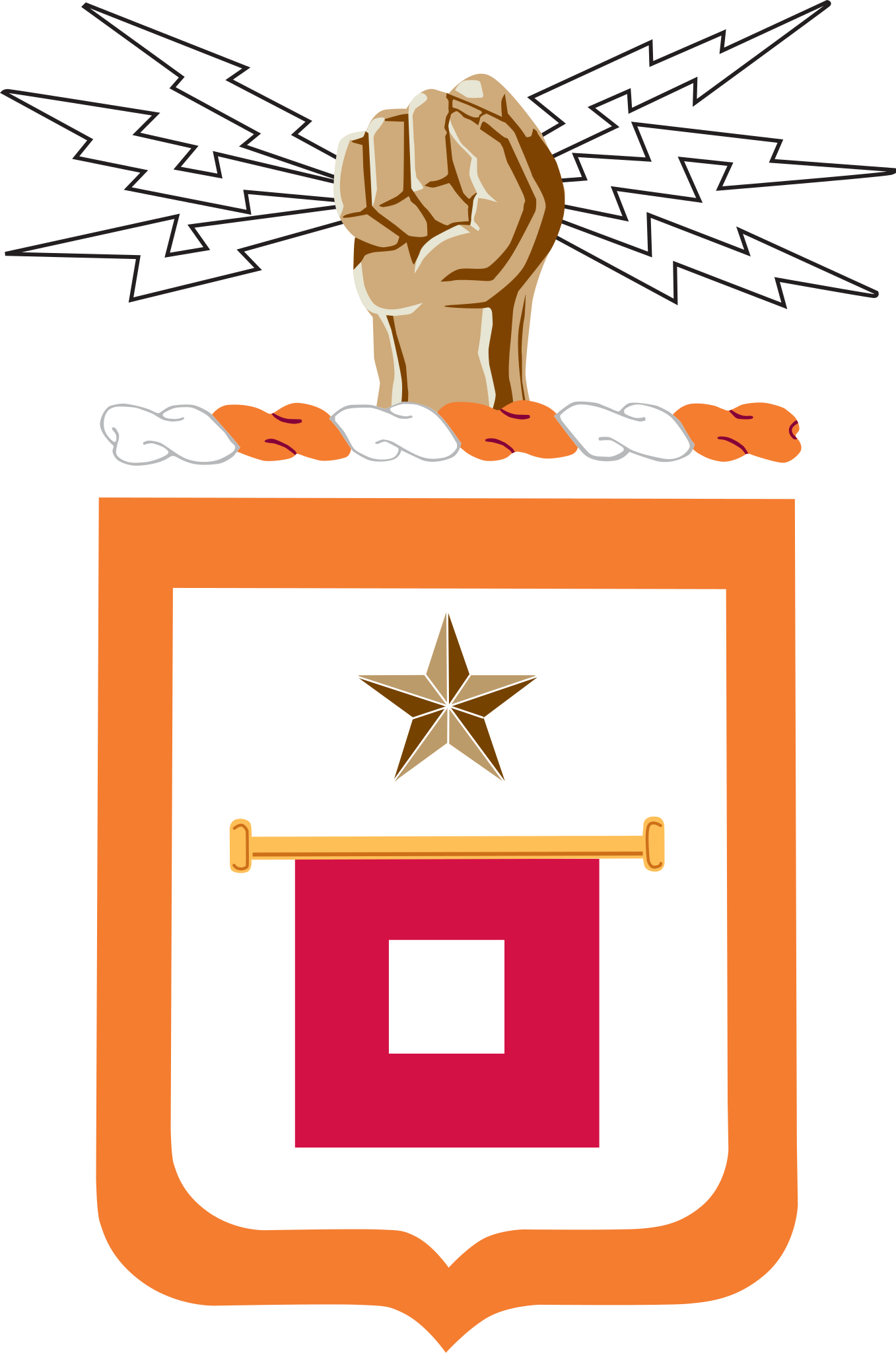
- U.S. Army Signal Corps coat of arms.

Site information
- Type: Military research laboratory
- Owner: Department of Defense
- Operator: U.S. Army
- Controlled by: Army Signal Corps
- Condition: Closed

Site history
- Built: 1930

The Signal Corps Laboratories (SCL) was a research installation under the command of the U.S. Army Signal Corps. Headquartered at Fort Monmouth, New Jersey, SCL directed research on electronics, radar, and communication systems for the U.S. Army. Throughout its history, SCL operated under many names as the organizational structure of the Signal Corps and the U.S. Army changed over time.

== History ==
=== Post-World War I ===
The Signal Corps Laboratories emerged as a result of declining economic conditions that compelled the U.S. Army Signal Corps to consolidate its widespread laboratories. By the late 1920s, the Signal Corps administered seven different major laboratories across the United States. In Washington, D.C., it had the Signal Corps Electrical Laboratory, the Signal Corps Meteorological Laboratory, the Signal Corps Research Laboratory at the National Bureau of Standards, and the Photographic Laboratory at Fort Humphreys (now Fort Lesley J. McNair). In addition, the Signal Corps Aircraft Radio Laboratory was located at Wright Field in Dayton, Ohio, the Subaqueous Sound Ranging Laboratory was stationed at Fort H. G. Wright in New York, and the Radio Laboratory was established at Fort Monmouth in New Jersey.

In 1929, the Signal Corps transferred the Electrical Laboratory, the Meteorological Laboratory, and the Research Laboratory at the Bureau of Standards to Fort Monmouth where the Radio Laboratory resided. In 1930, the Subaqueous Sound Ranging Laboratory was also moved from Fort H. G. Wright to Fort Monmouth. Together, these five laboratories formed the consolidated Signal Corps Laboratories.

Initially, nine wooden buildings built in 1918 housed SCL operations. However, the need for more space led Colonel William R. Blair, the first director of the consolidated laboratories, to arrange the construction of a permanent laboratory building in 1934. When construction finished in 1935, the newly built facility was designated as the Fort Monmouth Signal Laboratory.

=== World War II ===
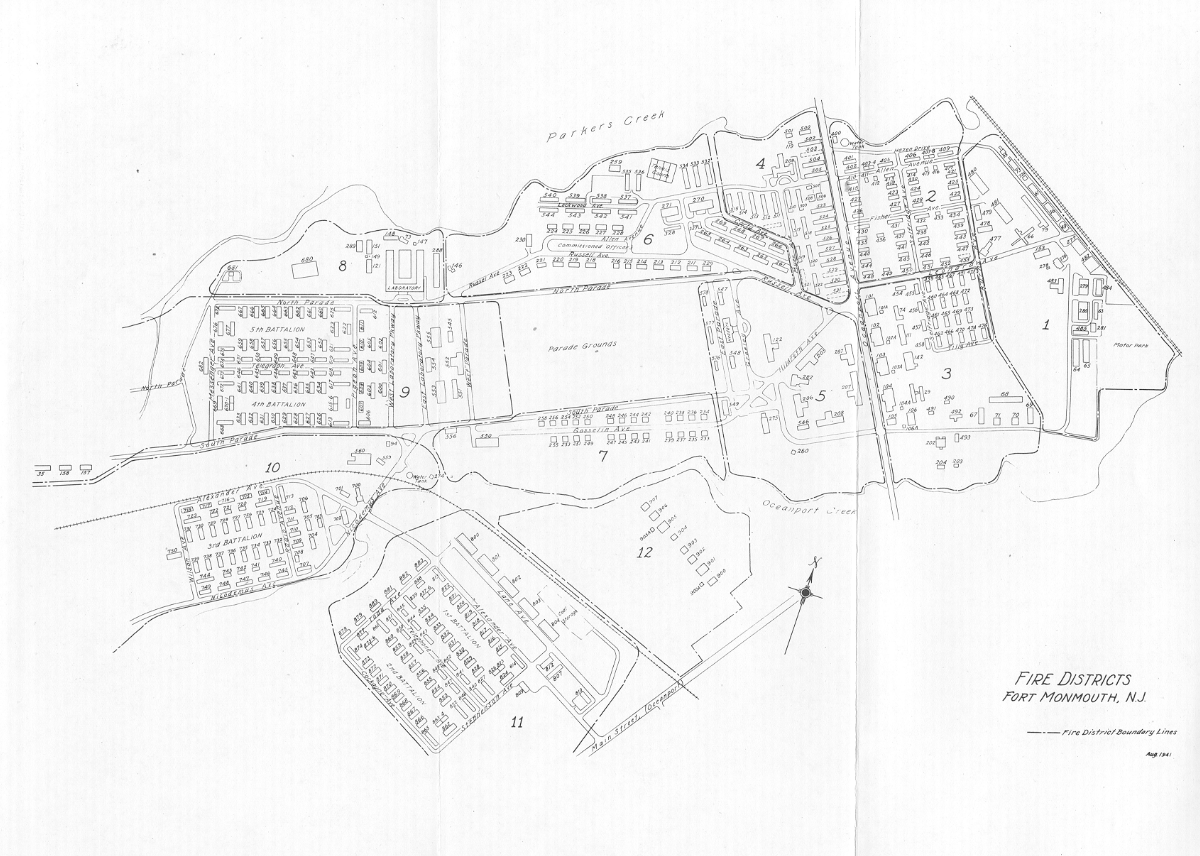
A map of Fort Monmouth in 1941.

In light of the ongoing war in Europe, military interest in the United States reached a feverish level as many anticipated the nation’s entry into the second World War. From 1940 to 1941, the Signal Corps established three field laboratories near Fort Monmouth to supplement the expanding research efforts of SCL.

Field Laboratory Number One was situated west of Red Bank, New Jersey, and was primarily responsible for the development of ground communications technologies and radio equipment. Spanning 46 acres, the site was named Camp Coles in honor of Colonel Ray Howard Coles, the Executive Officer for the Chief Signal Officer of the American Expeditionary Forces in World War I. Field Laboratory Number Two served as a location where Signal Corps researchers worked on wire, direction-finding, sound-and-light, and meteorological projects. Situated in Camp Charles Wood near Eatontown, New Jersey, the field laboratory later became known as the Eatontown Signal Laboratory. Field Laboratory Number Three acted as one of the principal facilities for radar research, development, and testing during World War II. Due to the significant military importance of radar at the time, the Office of the Chief Signal Officer made efforts to keep the covert activities of Field Laboratory Number Three separate from SCL’s general operations. Known as the Signal Corps Radar Laboratory, the facility was established at Fort Hancock in Sandy Hook, New Jersey, but work also took place near Sandy Hook in the boroughs of Rumson and Highlands. However, confusion over the sanction of the word “radar” prompted the U.S. Department of War to move the installation to a site in Belmar, New Jersey, where it operated under a different name. The field laboratory site was soon designated as Camp Evans in 1942 in honor of Lieutenant Colonel Paul W. Evans, a World War I Signal Corps officer who had died in 1936.

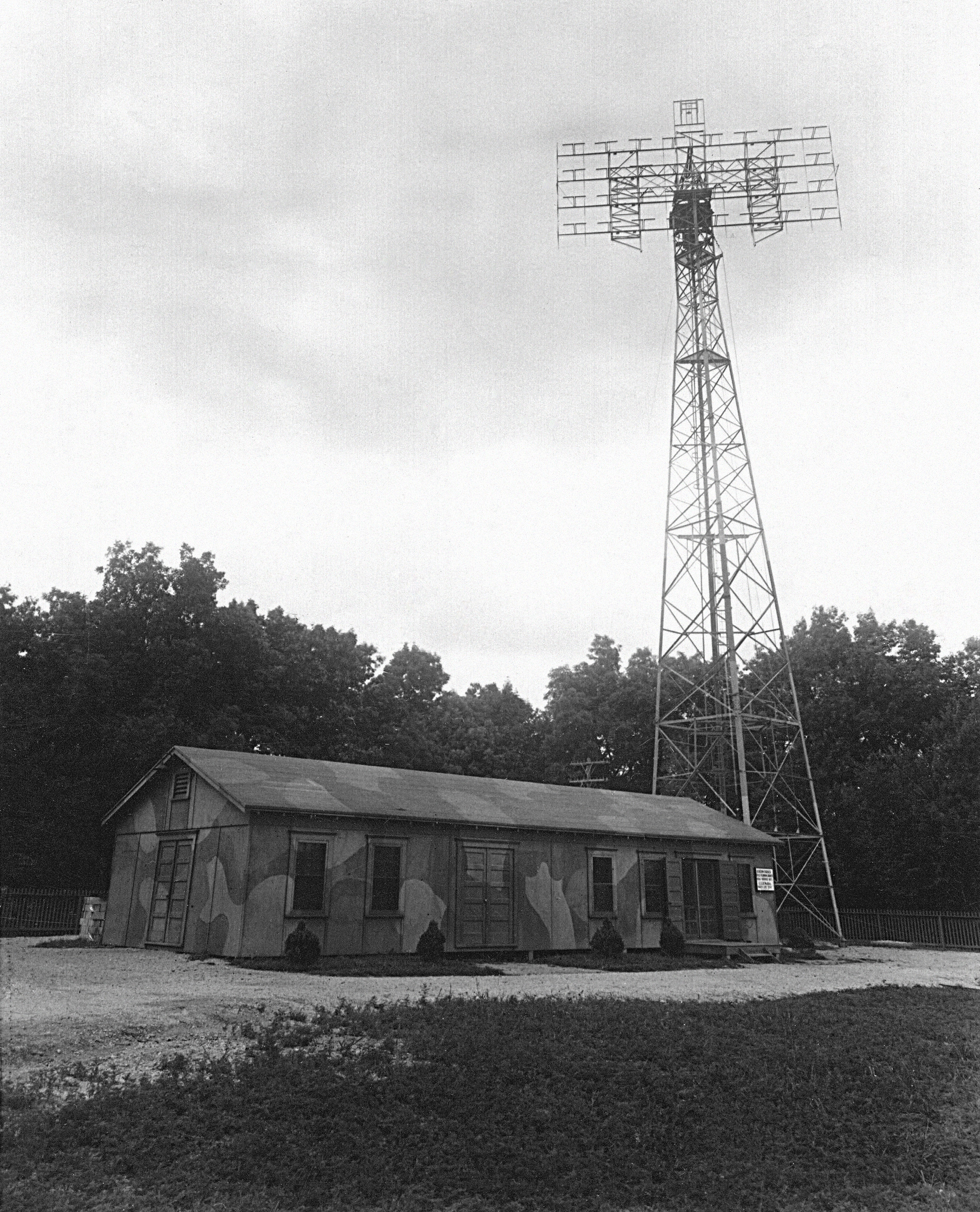
SCR-271 at Camp Evans.

Early in the war, the Fort Monmouth Signal Laboratory and Field Laboratories Number One and Two were collectively known as the Signal Corps General Development Laboratories (SCGDL). In March 1942, the U.S. Army was reorganized into three commands—the Army Ground Forces, the Army Air Forces, and the Army Service Forces—with the Signal Corps belonging in the last category. Then, nine months later in December, the operations at Fort Monmouth Signal Laboratory, Camp Coles, Eatontown Signal Laboratory, and Camp Evans were consolidated to form the Signal Corps Ground Service. By this point, SCL possessed a personnel strength of over 14,500 military and civilian personnel.

=== Post-World War II ===
Following World War II, SCL and its field laboratories underwent several structural changes, as well as name changes, in order to better organize their activities.

In February 1945, the Eatontown Signal Laboratory was transferred from the Signal Corps to the Army Air Forces. The facility would later be renamed to Watson Laboratories and moved to Rome, New York in 1951. In April 1945, a general order by the U.S. Department of War renamed Camp Coles to Coles Signal Laboratory and Camp Evans to Evans Signal Laboratory. Two months later, Fort Monmouth Signal Laboratory was redesignated as Squier Signal Laboratory in honor of Major General George Owen Squier, the founder of SCL and Chief Signal Officer during World War I.

Most notably, the Signal Corps Ground Service was reorganized into the Signal Corps Engineering Laboratories (SCEL) in May 1945. With the absence of the Eatontown Signal Laboratory, SCEL consisted of the newly named Squier Signal Laboratory, Coles Signal Laboratory, and Evans Signal Laboratory. As a consolidated laboratory, SCEL prioritized research pertaining to communication systems, radar, electron tubes, and component improvement as well as meteorology, proximity fuzes, and photography.

While the personnel strength of SCEL had dropped significantly after the war, the existing laboratory buildings were not large enough to house the laboratories’ growing workforce. By 1952, the laboratory buildings had reached maximum capacity, and the Signal Corps began planning the construction of a new laboratory building to consolidate all SCEL activities. In 1954, the Signal Corps began moving SCEL operations to the new but incomplete Albert J. Myer Center in the Charles Woods Area of Fort Monmouth. Named in honor of the first Chief Signal Officer of the U.S. Army Signal Corps, the new facility was commonly referred to as the Hexagon due to the building’s unique six-sided shape. However, the Albert J. Myer Center never realized its planned hexagon shape, purportedly due to misappropriated funds. As a result, the four-story tall building exhibited only four sides and permanently lacked two of its six intended sides. Upon consolidation, the individual laboratories of SCEL were divided into seven divisions: Communications, Radar, Countermeasures, Physical Sciences, Electron Devices, Production and Maintenance Engineering, and Components, Materials and Power Sources.

In 1958, the U.S. Army redesignated SCEL as the U.S. Army Signal Research and Development Laboratory (USASRDL). In that same year, USASRDL created the Institute for Exploratory Research to place greater emphasis on internal research.

=== White Sands Missile Range ===
The first recorded activity of SCEL at White Sands Missile Range (WSMR) was on April 2, 1946, when the Signal Corps deployed a team of 10 men to the then-named White Sands Proving Ground (WSPG) to assist the testing of the captured German V-2 rockets. By 1949, the U.S. Department of the Army established the SCEL Field Station No. 1 at Fort Bliss, Texas as a class II activity. Field Station No. 1 pioneered research in radar tracking and communication systems to provide support for the early missile programs at WSPG.

In 1952, Field Station No. 1 was reorganized into the White Sands Signal Corps Agency (WSSCA), which sought to improve munition performance by conducting high altitude and upper-atmosphere research. In 1954, WSSCA expanded to form three teams: one at Yuma Proving Ground, one at Dugway Proving Ground, and one at the Canal Zone in Panama. As part of its duties, the organization was tasked with conducting high-altitude and upper-atmosphere research using various rockets. These included the Nike Cajun rocket, the Army tactical Loki rocket, and the Arcas rocket.On May 1, 1958, the White Sands Proving Ground was officially renamed White Sands Missile Range.

By 1959, WSSCA was redesignated as the U.S. Army Signal Missile Support Agency (SMSA) after its size and scope of operations had doubled. SMSA was responsible for providing communication-electronic, meteorologic, and other support to WSMR as well as conducting research and development in meteorology, electronic warfare, and missile vulnerability. At the time, the meteorological activities at WSMR were under the jurisdiction of the U.S. Army Electronics Research and Development Activity as well as the Atmospheric Sciences Office, an organization under the operational control of SCEL at Fort Monmouth.

=== Closure ===
In 1962, the U.S. Army went through a dramatic reorganization of its internal structure in response to a study directed by Secretary of Defense Robert McNamara. At the time, the Signal Corps belonged to the Technical Services, a coalition of independently administered agencies that supplied weapons, equipment, and services to the Army. Originally created as part of the Army Service Forces (ASF) during World War II, this group consisted of the Quartermaster Corps, the Corps of Engineers, the Medical Department, the Ordnance Department, the Signal Corps, the Chemical Warfare Service, and the Transportation Corps. Even after the dissolution of the ASF in 1946, the Technical Services continued its operations, except for some changes—the Chemical Warfare Service was dropped and the Finance Department was added.

As part of the Army reorganization in 1962, Congress eliminated the Technical Services and transferred the material development and procurement functions of the Signal Corps to the newly created Army Materiel Command (AMC). On August 1, 1962, AMC established one of its subordinate elements, the U.S. Army Electronics Command (ECOM), at Fort Monmouth to continue the research and development operations previously helmed by the Signal Corps. Under ECOM, the USASRDL was renamed to the U.S. Army Electronics Research and Development Laboratory that same year. In addition, SMSA became a part of the Electronics Research and Development Activity (ERDA) at WSMR under ECOM. During the restructuring of ECOM in 1964, however, the U.S. Army Electronics Research and Development Laboratory was changed to the U.S. Army Electronics Laboratories.

Ultimately, the U.S. Army Electronics Laboratories was discontinued on June 1, 1965. The organization was then broken up into six separate Army laboratories: the Electronic Components Laboratory, the Communications/ADP Laboratory, the Atmospheric Sciences Laboratory, the Electronic Warfare Laboratory, the Avionics Laboratory, and the Combat Surveillance and Target Acquisition Laboratory. Around the same time, ECOM established the Institute for Exploratory Research. The Electronic Components Laboratory and the Institute for Exploratory Research would later merge to become the Electronics Technology and Devices Laboratory, and Vulnerability Assessment Laboratory would eventually emerge out from the Electronic Warfare Laboratory.

== Research ==
Upon consolidation, the Signal Corps Laboratories was primarily responsible for the design and development of communications equipment and the improvement of meteorological services. Much of its research pushed the boundaries of radio technology, so much so that the Signal Corps employed a standard nomenclature for radio technology where each item began with the letters “SCR.” These letters originally stood for “set, complete, radio” but instead came to signify “Signal Corps radio.”

=== Radar ===
During its early years, SCL was most well-known for its role in the invention of radar. While the U.S. Navy and the Naval Research Laboratory were responsible for the initial development of radar in the 1920s, the Signal Corps significantly advanced its capabilities in the years leading up to World War II. Before 1930, the Ordnance Department was responsible for radar work on the U.S. Army side. Known as Project OKO 26242, “Investigation of Detection Devices Using Infra-Red Ray,” the effort concentrated on finding a way to detect an airplane and its position at night. However, after a conference in January 1930 with representatives of the Coast Artillery Corps and the Signal Corps, the Ordnance Department agreed to transfer its radar work and equipment to the Signal Corps.

In February 1931, SCL Director Major William R. Blair established Project 88, “Position Finding by Means of Light,” to continue the mission on detecting airplanes. The word “light” in the project title referred to electromagnetic radiation, particularly infrared light. The undertaking initially focused on the use of reflected infrared waves as a potential form of radar detection. However, Blair abandoned the reflected infrared method in 1933 after researchers discovered that tracking a target to a distance of 32,000 feet using this method required a significantly stronger source of infrared light than what was available. SCL subsequently moved onto heat detection and reflected radio waves. By 1935, Blair determined that the use of high-frequency radio pulses provided the most promising approach to radar detection. Once sent out, the radio pulse waves reflected off of metallic objects, and then a receiver could catch the returning pulses and determine the position, speed, and direction of the metallic objects.

In June 1936, SCL developed a 75-watt breadboard model transmitter, an early precursor to the first Army radars. By this point, SCL and the Naval Research Laboratory decided to share information on developments of their respective radar systems to avoid duplication of effort. Nevertheless, the research and development of radar remained a tightly guarded secret within the U.S. military. In October 1936, Lieutenant Colonel Louis E. Bender of the Office of the Chief Signal Officer visited the research laboratories of the General Electric Company, the RCA Manufacturing Company, and the Bell Telephone Laboratories and concluded that commercial progress on radio detection lagged far behind that of the U.S. military laboratories.

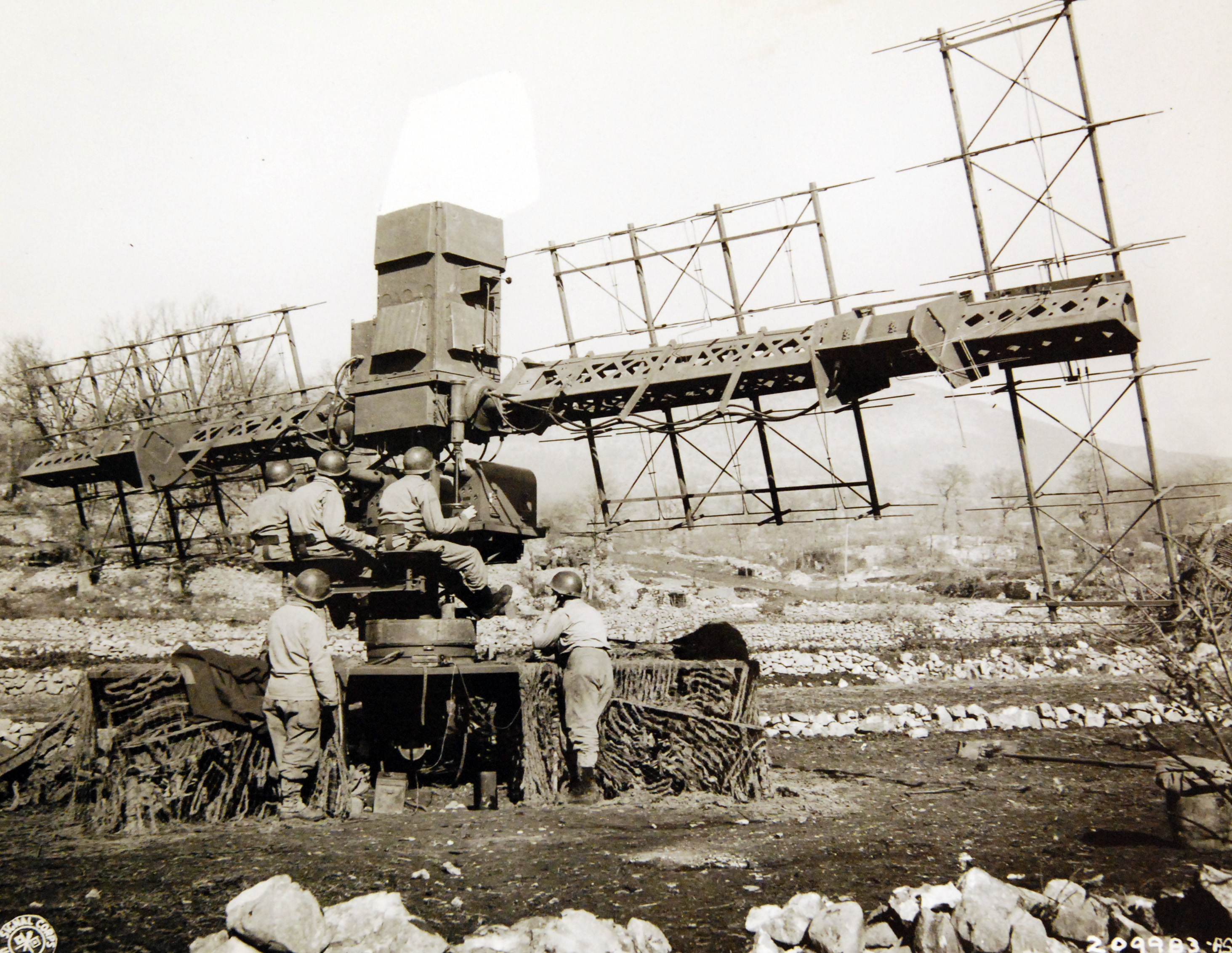
A five-man crew operating an SCR-268 radio set on an Italian hillside.

In December 1936, SCL conducted the field test of its preliminary radar system, including the 75-watt transmitter, near Newark Airport in New Jersey to determine if it could detect the commercial airplanes flying in the sky. Researchers beamed radio pulses from the transmitter along the general flight path of the planes, while a receiver was set up a mile away. The experiment proved to be a success, and Blair wrote a letter to Bender with the following text: “You will be interested to know that yesterday, December 14, we succeeded in locating an airplane by the pulse method over a range of approximately 0 to 7 miles.” Following the field test, SCL improved the antenna systems for both the transmitter and the receivers in order to multiply the power of the transmitter beam and obtain more accurate readings of the target.

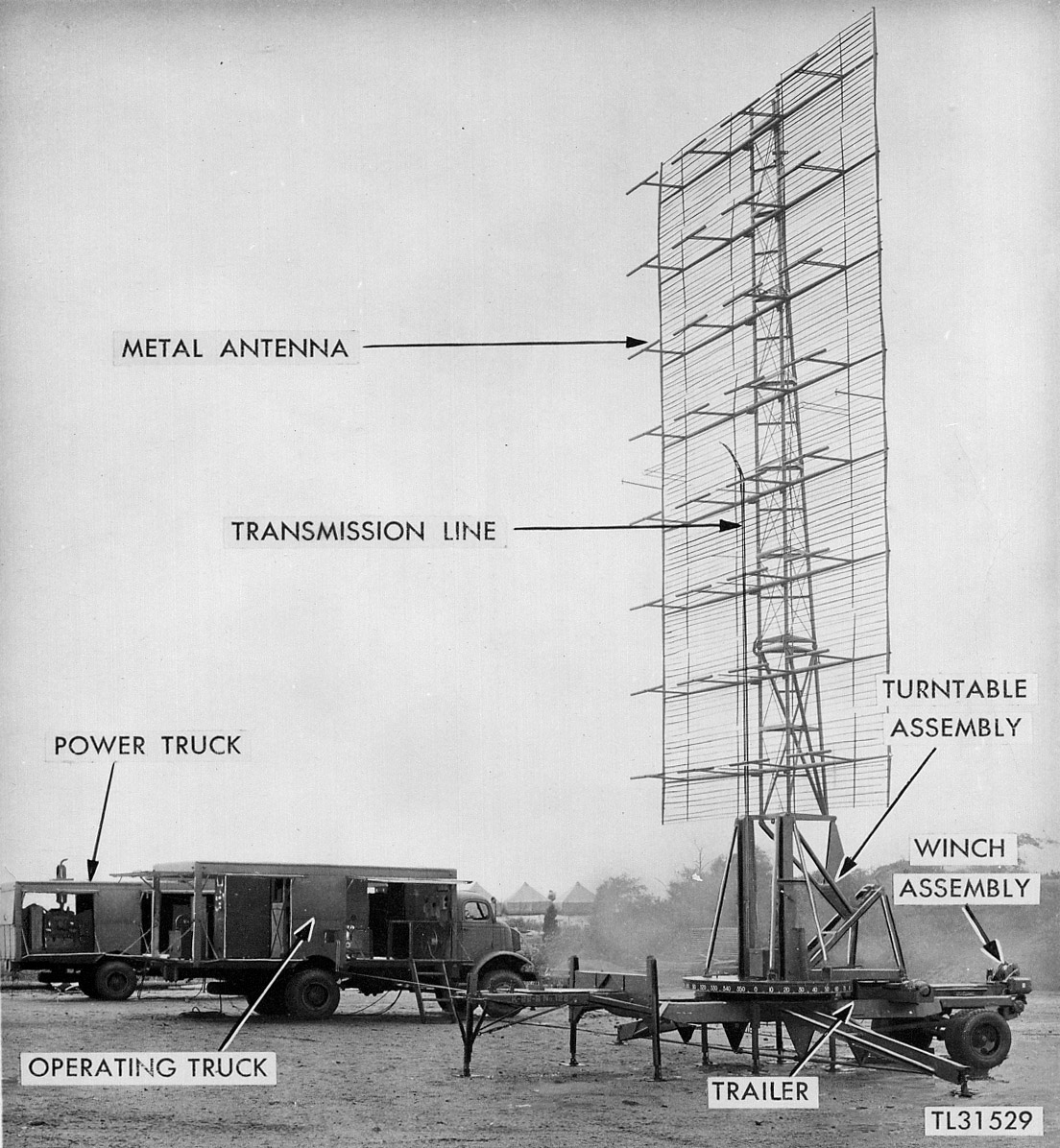
A diagram of the SCR-270 radio set.

In May 1937, Blair invited Secretary of War Harry H. Woodring, Assistant Chief of the Air Corps Brigadier General Henry Arnold, and other government officials to Fort Monmouth for a showcase of the SCL radar’s capabilities. As part of the demonstration, a B-10 bomber plane was arranged to fly over Fort Monmouth under the cover of darkness in simulated “sneak raids.” The objective was for SCL personnel to point searchlights on the plane and have the target in sight the moment the searchlights were turned on. On the evening of May 26, the attendees watched SCL personnel use various radio pulse equipment in conjunction with the laboratories’ heat detector to track the plane. Each time the aircraft approached within range of the radar, its position was determined and the searchlights followed the plane over the base. Impressed by the demonstration, Woodring praised the “amazing scientific advances made by the Signal Corps,” and substantial funding was provided to SCL to continue the development of its radar technology.

SCL subsequently developed the SCR-268, a short-range radar set designed to control searchlights and antiaircraft guns. The SCR-268 was formally accepted by the Army after successful tests at Fort Monroe, Virginia, in 1938. At the request of the Air Corps, SCL also developed two radar sets for long-range aircraft detection, the mobile SCR-270 and the fixed SCR-271. Both the SCR-270 and the SCR-271 had a range of 120 miles and constituted the backbone of the Aircraft Warning Service by the time the United States entered World War II. SCL continued its highly classified research and development activities on radar at its field laboratories during the war, with Camp Evans becoming one of the principal facilities for radar work in the United States.

=== Project Diana ===
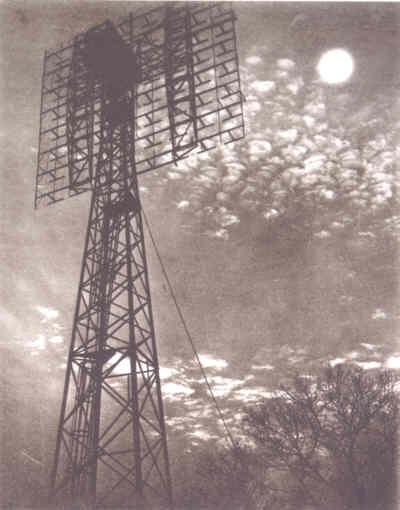
Project Diana radar antenna at Fort Monmouth, New Jersey.

Following the use of atomic weapons against Japan in 1945, the U.S. military began worrying about the type of weapons that might threaten the nation in the future. Back in 1943, General Henry “Hap” Arnold forewarned the emergence of projectiles that could fly at speeds too fast to detect and be powerful enough to wipe out an entire city—an early prediction of the intercontinental ballistic missile. In 1945, the Pentagon ordered Lieutenant Colonel John H. DeWitt Jr., the director of the Evans Signal Laboratory, to investigate whether such a weapon could be detected and tracked using radar. This mission happened to coincide with one of Dewitt’s personal projects, which was to demonstrate the feasibility of bouncing radio signals off the moon. In 1940, Dewitt had previously tried and failed to reflect ultrashort radio waves off the moon in an attempt to expand the study of the ionosphere. This time, Dewitt assembled a team of five people, including mathematician Walter McAfee, to push the boundaries of how far electronic signals can be transmitted into the upper atmosphere. In place of incoming ballistic missiles, the team chose the moon as the target of their radio signals. As a result, the undertaking was named Project Diana in honor of the Greek goddess of the moon.

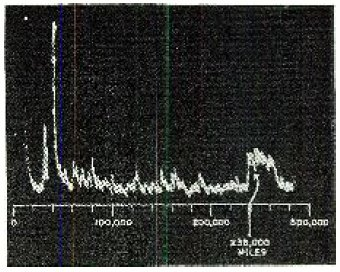
The oscilloscope display capturing the transmitted signal to and subsequent return signal from the Moon.

Rather than designing an entirely new device for this project, Dewitt and his team modified an existing SCR-271 radar set to serve as the transmitter. The 40-foot square bedspring antenna array was mounted atop a 30-meter tower at Fort Monmouth and aimed at the moon. Since the antenna had only azimuth control, the team only had a narrow window of 40 minutes each day for experiments while the moon was in the prime location as it was rising or setting. After several unsuccessful attempts, the team detected the first signals reflected back from the rising moon on January 10, 1946, at 11:58 am. Traveling at the speed of light, the radio waves from the modified array took about 2.5 seconds to travel from Fort Monmouth to the moon and back, a distance of over 800,000 kilometers. The experiment was repeated several times before the War Department announced the accomplishment to the public on January 24.

Project Diana represented the first demonstration of artificially created signals piercing the ionosphere and is often noted as the birth of the U.S. space program as well as that of radar astronomy. The resulting “Moonbounce” technique, now known as Earth-Moon-Earth (EME) communication, granted researchers the ability to observe and measure the distance of nearby astronomical objects by analyzing their reflections. It eventually led to the accurate topographical mapping of the moon and planets, the measurement and analysis of the ionosphere, and the development of satellites.

=== Meteorology ===
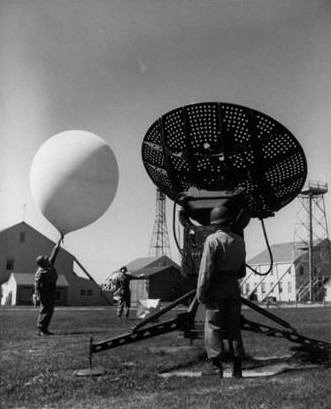
Signal Corps researchers conduct electronic weather forecasting with a weather balloon.

The development of new meteorological technologies and techniques have long been a staple function of the Signal Corps and its laboratory installations. Since World War I, the Signal Corps was responsible for reporting the weather and other meteorological information to the Army for the purposes of long-range artillery and antiaircraft support, storm tracking, and general operational planning. In 1929, the Signal Corps oversaw the launch of the first radio-equipped weather balloon at Fort Monmouth. Although SCL lost its official weather reporting and forecasting duties to the U.S. Army Air Corps in 1937, the laboratories retained their responsibility for the development, procurement, supply, and maintenance of the Army’s meteorological equipment for decades. While the U.S. Air Force provided the Army with operational weather support, the Signal Corps served as the primary agent for Army meteorological research and development. The varied effects of weather on communications equipment ensured that meteorological activities remained a fundamental component of SCL.

At one point during the 1940s, SCL acquired Raytheon Manufacturing Company’s AN/CPS-9 Storm Detection Radar, the first radar system designed specifically for meteorological use. Researchers at Evans Signal Laboratory were tasked with modifying the CPS-9 to suit the needs and requirements of the Army Air Forces (AAF) Weather Service. In 1948, the new weather radar successfully observed a rainstorm from a distance of 185 miles and tracked it as it passed over Fort Monmouth. The modified AN/CPS-9 was brought into service by the AAF Weather Service (redesignated as the Air Weather Service in 1946) in 1954 and installed at military bases around the world.

In addition to weather prediction, SCL investigated the behavior of wind and the physical properties of the upper atmosphere, often in order to improve the guidance and control of missiles. Radiosondes equipped to high-altitude balloons were used to measure humidity, temperature, and pressure more than 20 miles high up in the atmosphere. For altitudes above that, SCL researchers in the post-WWII era used rockets to conduct atmospheric studies and collect data. The White Sands Signal Corps Agency, which originated as an SCEL field station, experienced a series of advancements in multiple areas of weather research during the 1950s. Tasked with conducting high-altitude and upper-atmosphere research using various sounding rockets like the Nike-Cajun and the Arcas, WSSCA helped launch more than 8,000 rockets around the world. In 1957, researchers launched Loki II rockets into the air and used radar to track the drift of the metallic chaff that was released at designated altitudes, through which they obtained new knowledge of high-altitude winds in the process.

The focus on meteorological research and development persisted as WSSCA became the U.S. Army Signal Missile Support Agency in 1959. SMSA developed the Sonic Observation of Trajectory and Impact of Missiles (SOTIM) System, which provided acoustic information on missiles upon re-entry and impact. These stations were installed at 16 different points at White Sands Missile Range and were also equipped to measure wind speed, temperature, and humidity. SMSA also built meteorological rockets that could carry a 70-pound instrument package as high as 600,000 feet in order to obtain upper atmospheric data.

=== Satellites ===
During the late 1950s, SCL (then called the U.S. Army Signal Research and Development Laboratory) represented one of the major players on the U.S. side of the Space Race against the Soviet Union. The laboratory’s long history of advancements in electronic communications technology enabled SCL researchers to make significant contributions to the payload of several successful satellites.

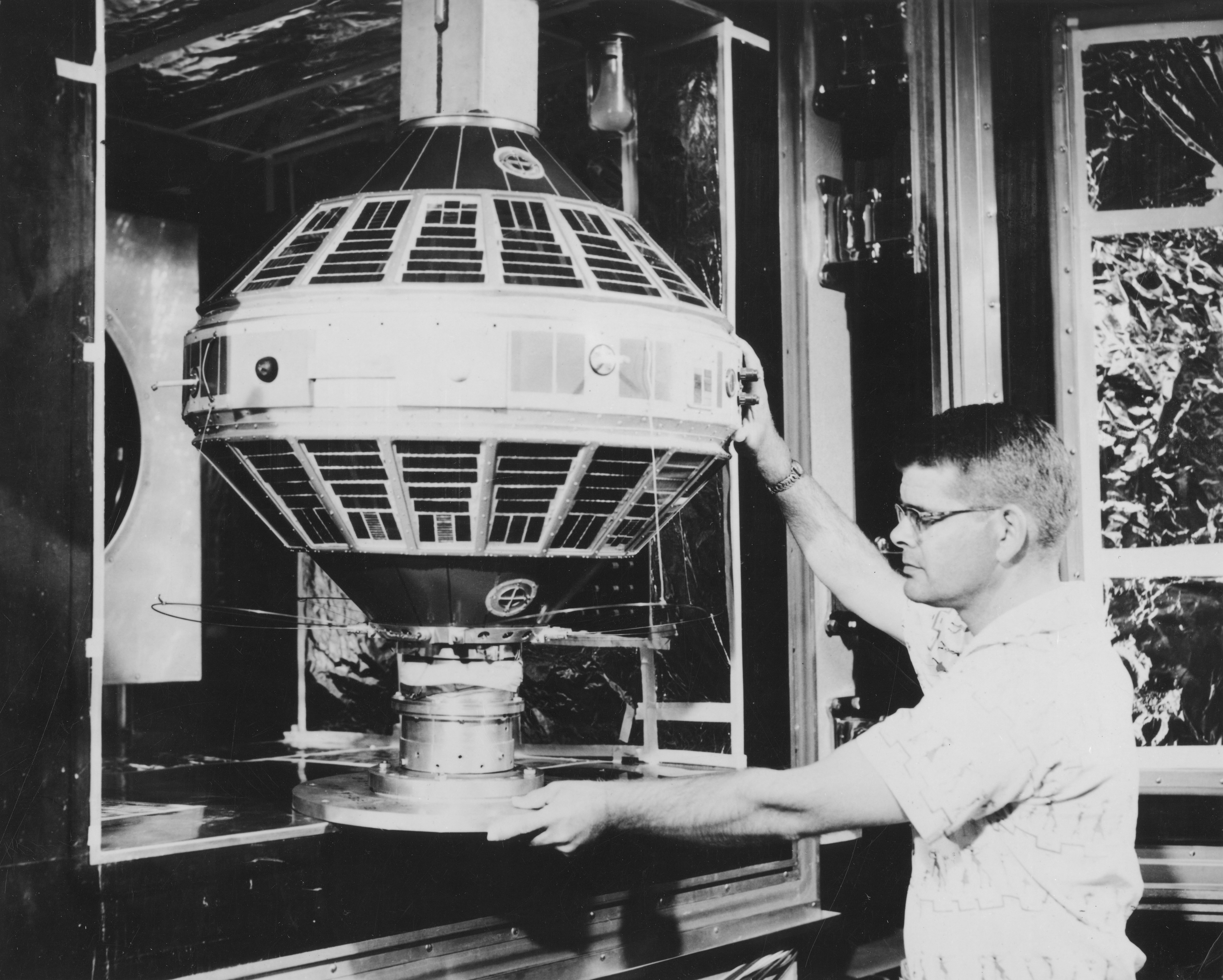
Researcher examines solar cells for Vanguard I satellite.

In 1955, the same year that the United States announced its intentions to launch artificial satellites into space, SCL began testing the application of solar cells for satellites. The effort culminated in the development of solar cells to power the Vanguard I satellite. As a result, Vanguard I became the first solar-powered satellite in the world when it was launched into orbit on March 17, 1958. The solar power devices developed by SCL enabled Vanguard I’s radio transmitters to operate for years, whereas a conventional battery would have only lasted several days. Due to the success of the solar cells, solar power quickly became the primary method of powering satellites and space probes following Vanguard I.

SCL’s contribution to the Space Race continued with Project SCORE (Signal Communications via Orbiting Relay Equipment), which orchestrated the launch of the first communications satellite in the world. Launched on December 18, 1958, the SCORE satellite was jointly developed by SCL and the Advanced Research Projects Agency (ARPA) with help from the U.S. Air Force. The spacecraft carried a communications package designed and built by SCL that contained a tape recording of President Dwight D. Eisenhower’s Christmas greeting to the world. This message of good will was broadcast from the satellite to countries around the world, proving for the first time that orbiting satellites can relay voice and data signals over great distances.

This achievement was followed up with the successful launch of TIROS-1 on April 1, 1960, as the world’s first full-scale weather satellite. The Television Infrared Observation Satellite (TIROS) program served as a joint government experiment between SCL, NASA, the U.S. Weather Bureau, and the U.S. Naval Photographic Interpretation Center to determine if satellites could aid researchers on the study of the Earth’s weather. The TIROS-1 satellite was equipped with two television cameras that took pictures of the Earth’s cloud formations from above and sent them down to ground stations at Fort Monmouth and in Hawaii within a matter of minutes. Over the course of three months, the satellite transmitted more than 22,952 pictures. The success of the TIROS program demonstrated the value of satellites for weather forecasting and meteorology.

Around the same time as Project TIROS, SCL also helmed the Courier program, which performed communications experiments involving the Courier 1B satellite following its launch into orbit on October 4, 1960. The Courier program was first proposed by SCL in September 1958 as a way to test the feasibility of creating a global military communications network through the use of satellites that could receive, store, and transmit information. Developed by SCL and managed by ARPA, the Courier 1B satellite had 19,200 solar cells covering the surface of the spacecraft, which stored the collected solar power in nickel-cadmium batteries. An internal clock ensured that the satellite only listened to radio transmissions while orbiting above one of the two designated ground stations in either Fort Monmouth or Salinas, Puerto Rico. Over the course of one orbit, Courier 1B demonstrated that it could pick up a radio message from the ground station in Fort Monmouth and later relay that message to the ground station in Salinas. Researchers also tested the communication volume that the satellite could handle at once. During the 14-minute window in which Courier 1B stayed within range of one of the ground stations, operators relayed hundreds of thousands of words in teletypewriter code to the satellite. When Courier 1B passed over the other ground station, it transmitted the entire message to the operators at that station. This process of receiving and transmitting radio messages could also happen at the same time. Operators determined that Courier 1B could simultaneously receive and transmit about 68,000 words per minute while traveling at a speed of 16,000 miles per hour through space. In addition, the satellite was capable of receiving a photograph transmitted from one ground station and re-transmitting the image to the other ground station with no substantial loss in quality. The program concluded after Courier 1B’s payload stopped responding to commands from the ground stations after completing 228 orbits in 17 days.

== See also ==
- Atmospheric Sciences Laboratory (ASL)
- Electronics Technology and Devices Laboratory (ETDL)
- Vulnerability Assessment Laboratory (VAL)
